= Orsten Artis =

American basketball player

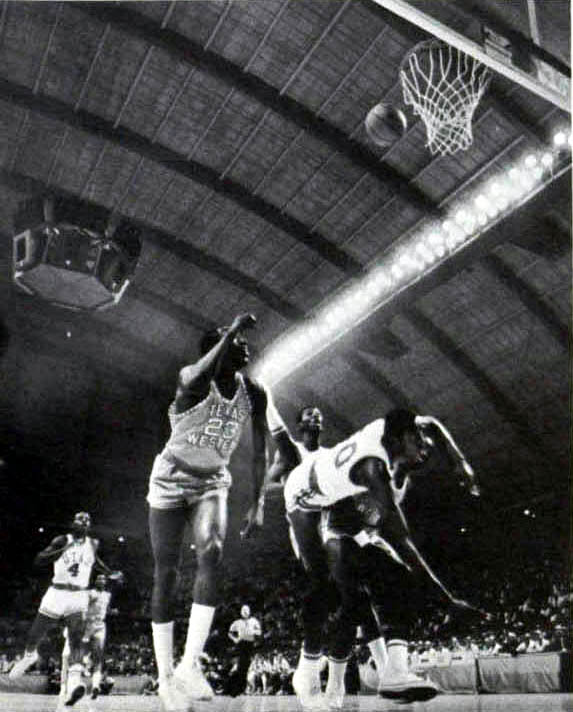
- Artis (n° 23) in action v Utah in 1966

Personal information
- Born: June 7, 1943 Gary, Indiana, U.S.
- Died: December 26, 2017 (aged 74) Merrillville, Indiana, U.S.
- Listed height: 6 ft 1 in (1.85 m)
- Listed weight: 175 lb (79 kg)

Career information
- High school: Froebel (Gary, Indiana)
- College: UTEP (1963–1966)
- NBA draft: 1966: undrafted
- Position: Forward

Career highlights
- NCAA champion (1966)

Orsten Artis (June 7, 1943 – December 26, 2017) was an American basketball player. He started at guard for the 1965–66 Texas Western Miners basketball team, the first team in history to win an NCAA championship with five African-American players in the starting lineup.

Artis, a 6'1 guard from Froebel High School in Gary, Indiana, played for coach Don Haskins at Texas Western University (now the University of Texas at El Paso). With teammates Bobby Joe Hill, David Lattin, Nevil Shed and Harry Flournoy, Artis was a part of the first team with an all-black starting lineup to win an NCAA championship after upsetting the Kentucky Wildcats in the 1966 NCAA championship. Artis averaged 12.6 points per game that season and was the team's third leading scorer. Artis served as co-captain of the team with Harry Flournoy.

The team was inducted into the Naismith Memorial Basketball Hall of Fame in 2007 and were the subject of the book and movie Glory Road, he was portrayed by Alphonso McAuley in the film.

Artis later became a police detective in his native Gary.

Artis was one of thirteen inductees in the Indiana Hall of Fame 2014 induction class.

Artis died on December 26, 2017, in his home in Merrillville, Indiana.

Artis had a son, Rex Erickson Brown, who resides in Brazil.
