= 1966 NCAA University Division basketball championship game =

1966 NCAA tournament championship game
National championship game
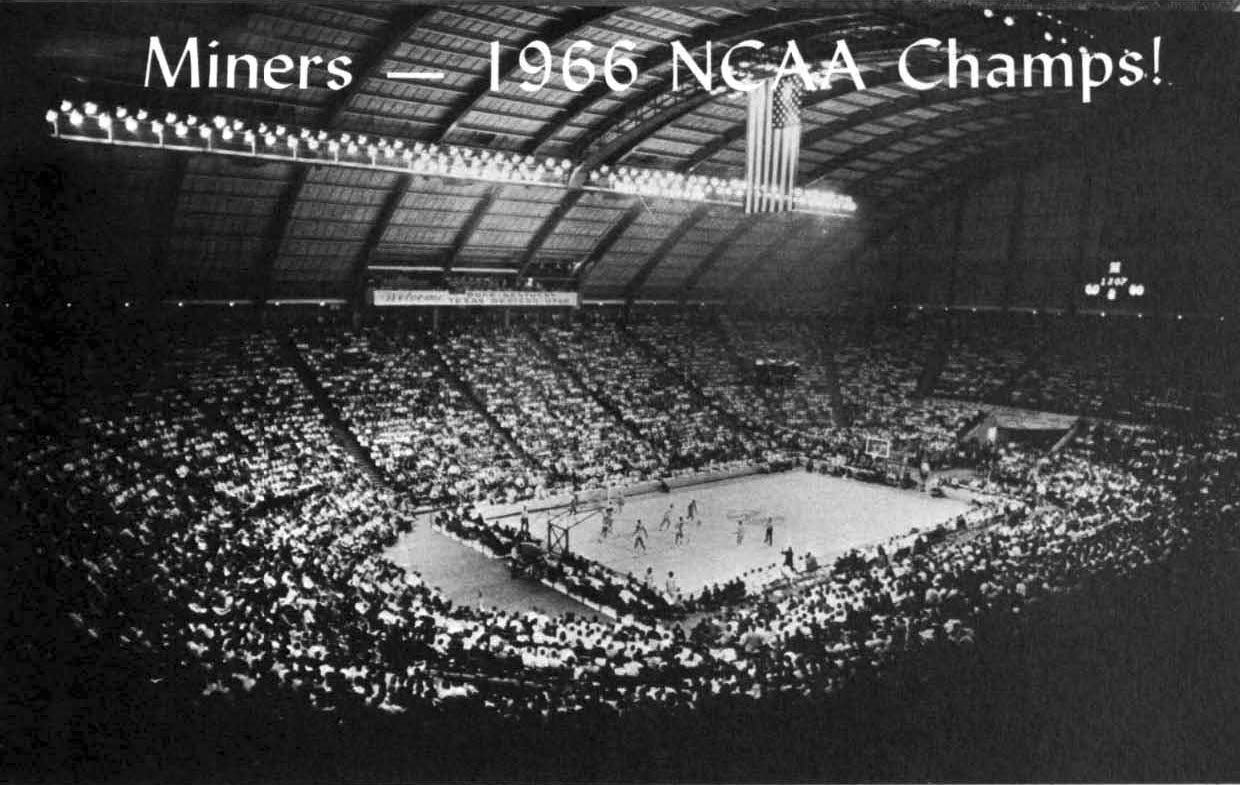
- Cole Field House during the championship game between the Kentucky Wildcats and the Texas Western Miners.
| Texas Western Miners | Kentucky Wildcats |
| Independent | SEC |
| (27–1) | (27–1) |
|---|---|
| 72 | 65 |
| Head coach: Don Haskins | Head coach: Adolph Rupp |
- AP: 3
- Coaches: 3
- AP: 1
- Coaches: 1
| | 1st half | 2nd half | Total |
|---|---|---|---|
| Texas Western Miners | 34 | 38 | 72 |
| Kentucky Wildcats | 31 | 34 | 65 |
- Date: March 19, 1966
- Venue: Cole Field House, College Park, Maryland
- Referees: Steve Honzo and Thornton Jenkins
- Attendance: 14,253

United States TV coverage
- Network: Sports Network Incorporated

The 1966 NCAA University Division basketball championship game was the final of the 1966 NCAA University Division basketball tournament and determined the national champion in the 1965–66 NCAA University Division men's basketball season. (Note: The University Division is the historic predecessor to the grouping of colleges and universities now known as NCAA Division I. The NCAA first divided member schools into the University Division and College Division in 1956; in 1973, the NCAA adopted a three-division setup in which major college programs were placed in Division I. Additionally, the NCAA did not sponsor championships in women's sports until the 1981–82 school year.) The game was held on March 19, 1966, at Cole Field House in College Park, Maryland. The Kentucky Wildcats, the number one ranked team in men's college basketball, faced the Texas Western Miners, who were ranked third in the nation.

Texas Western's starting lineup of five African Americans was the first all-black lineup in an NCAA title game; their opponents, by contrast, fielded an all-white squad. The Miners won 72–65, claiming the school's first national championship in men's college basketball. Their victory challenged assumptions widely held about black players at the time, and major college programs intensified their recruiting efforts towards African-American players in the years following the game.

== Background ==
=== Kentucky ===
The Wildcats, coached by Adolph Rupp, began the 1965–66 season with an 83–55 win over Hardin–Simmons University on December 1, 1965. In road games at Virginia and Illinois, Kentucky prevailed by 26 and 18 points respectively. Wins in three games at home gave the Wildcats a 6–0 win–loss record, and the team was selected at number ten in the AP Poll, having previously been unranked. After three more victories by margins of 10 points or more, the Wildcats began play in the Southeastern Conference (SEC) on January 8, 1966, at Florida. Kentucky won 78–64, before a contest in Georgia that required two overtime periods. The Wildcats, by this time up to second in the national rankings, managed a four-point victory. The team reached number one in the AP Poll in the February 8 rankings, and Kentucky's undefeated streak continued into early March. In the Wildcats' next-to-last regular season game, Tennessee handed them their first loss, by a score of 69–62. With a 103–74 win over Tulane, Kentucky completed the regular season with a record of 24–1 (15–1 in conference play), and had the top ranking in the AP Poll. Forward Pat Riley was the team's leading scorer; including postseason play, he averaged 21.9 points per game, and his 8.9 rebounds per game also led the club. Guard Louie Dampier had a 21.1 point-per-game average and played the most minutes of anyone on the Wildcats' roster. Larry Conley led Kentucky in assists.

Kentucky received an invitation to the NCAA Tournament and was placed in the Mideast region. The team did not play in the first round; its first appearance in the tournament came in the regional semifinals against Dayton. With an 86–79 victory, the Wildcats moved on to the regional final. Playing against Michigan, Kentucky reached the Final Four with a second straight seven-point win. The Wildcats' opponent in the Final Four was Duke, the champion of the East region. The Blue Devils held a one-point lead at halftime, but the Wildcats earned an 83–79 victory. Dampier led Kentucky with 23 points, while Riley added 19.

=== Texas Western ===
Coached by Don Haskins, the Miners' first game was on December 4, 1965, against Eastern New Mexico. Texas Western won by an 89–38 score, and added eight victories over the next 25 days. On December 30, the Miners faced Iowa, the fourth-ranked team in the country at the time. An 86–68 win, along with a nine-point victory over Tulsa, saw the Miners enter the January 4 rankings at number nine. Texas Western won three more games in January by double-digit margins. After defeating New Mexico State on February 1, the Miners played at Colorado State, prevailing by two points. An 81–72 win over Arizona moved the Miners to 17–0 for the season, and five further victories left them undefeated entering March. Their winning streak reached 23 games, with a second win against New Mexico State. In their last regular season game, the Miners suffered their first loss, against Seattle, 74–72, leaving them at 23–1. The team ended the regular season third in the AP Poll, having reached a peak position of second. Bobby Joe Hill had a team-high 15.0 points per game, while Dave Lattin had an average of 14.0 points per game and 8.6 rebounds per game. Orsten Artis and Nevil Shed also averaged more than 10.0 points per game, and Harry Flournoy led the Miners with 10.7 rebounds per game. In contrast to Kentucky, who sportswriter Michael Wilbon later called "as white as milk", the Miners' entire starting lineup consisted of African-Americans.

Texas Western was placed in the Midwest region in the NCAA Tournament. Unlike the Wildcats, the Miners played in the first round of the tournament, defeating Oklahoma City by 15 points. The Miners then faced Cincinnati in a contest that went into overtime; they emerged with a 78–76 win and a berth in the regional final against Kansas. Texas Western was stretched into double overtime, but they earned an 81–80 victory and a Final Four appearance. The Miners won by seven points against Utah to reach the national championship game, overcoming a 38-point effort by the Utes' Jerry Chambers. Artis led the Miners in scoring with 22 points; Hill had 18 points, and Willie Worsley added 12.

== Game summary ==
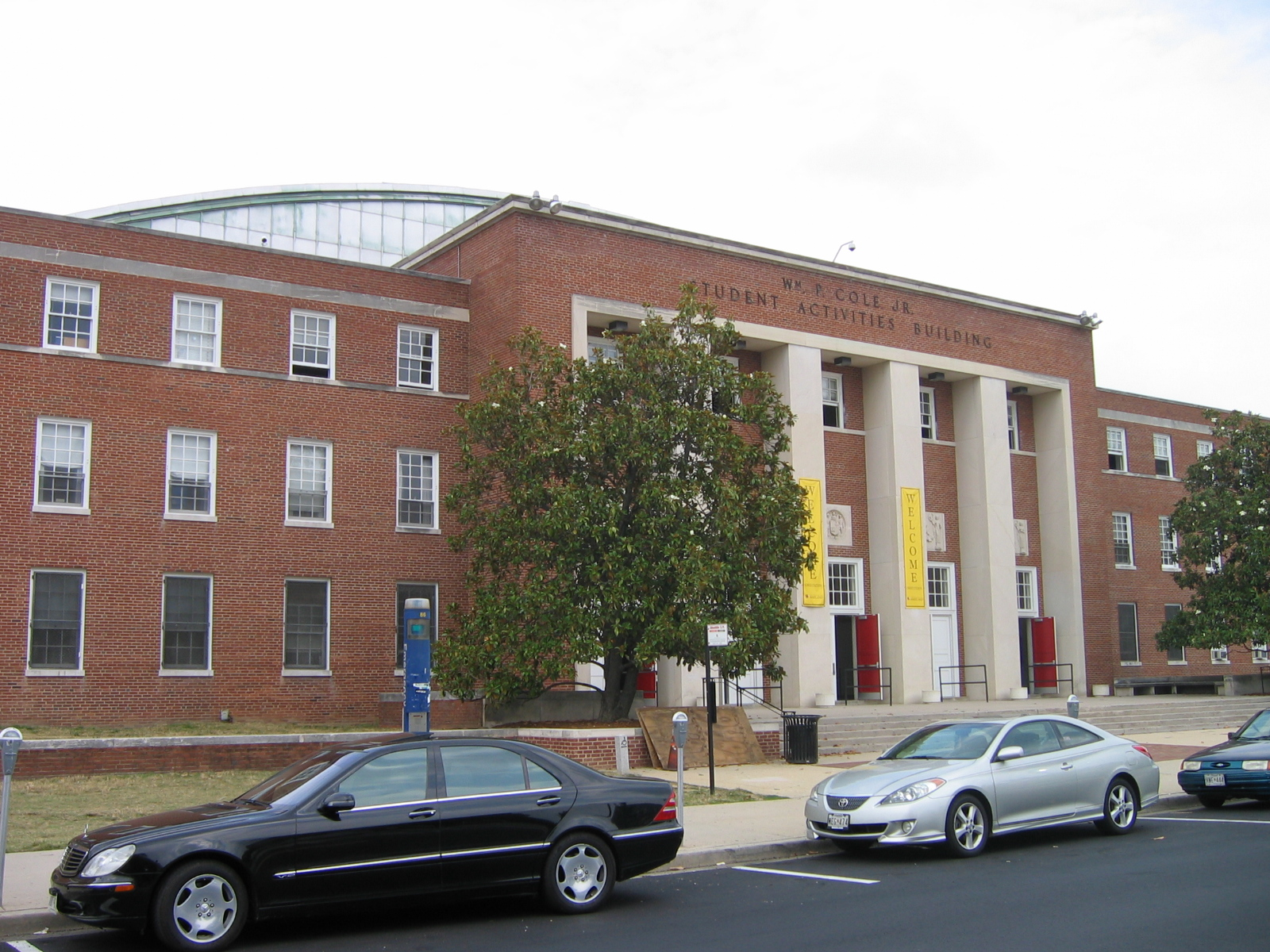
Cole Field House, site of the game

The game took place on March 19 at Cole Field House, on the campus of the University of Maryland, College Park, in front of an announced crowd of 14,253 fans. It was preceded by a third-place contest between the losing teams in the Final Four, Duke and Utah; the Blue Devils won 79–77. The championship game, which started at 10 p.m., was not broadcast on a major American station, instead airing on tape delay in certain cities. Sports Network Incorporated handled the original broadcast, and the full-length telecast appeared on ESPN in 2016. The Miners fielded an all-black starting lineup for the championship game, becoming the first team ever to do so in an NCAA Division I men's basketball tournament final. Haskins motivated his team by telling them about a promise made by Rupp that his white Kentucky team would not be defeated by an all-African-American lineup. The rotation employed by Haskins in the final consisted exclusively of black players, with two African-American bench players used along with the five starters. Haskins said of his roster choices that he had "played [his] best players, who happened to be black."

Riley won the opening tip for Kentucky, but the referee ruled that he had illegally jumped too early and awarded possession to Texas Western. On the Wildcats' first possession, Lattin committed a foul on Riley while trying to block his shot. Twice in the early stages of the game, Lattin scored on slam dunks; this came after Haskins had told him to dunk as early as possible, in an attempt to "send a message" to Kentucky. Defensively, the Wildcats utilized a 1–3–1 zone; in response to their move, Haskins opted to start three guards in the Miners' lineup, as Worsley joined Hill and Artis. The teams were tied at 9–9 before a Miners free throw which put them in front. Hill had steals on two straight Wildcats possessions around midway through the first half, and scored following each turnover. The sequence gave the Miners a larger lead, and was described by writer Frank Deford as a turning point in the game. The second dunk by Lattin followed, which gave the Miners a 16–11 advantage. Writer Curry Kirkpatrick described the game as "slow, tedious, [and] almost flat." Future college basketball coach Gary Williams, who was in attendance, later complimented the Miners' ball movement, recalling that "There were possessions where Texas Western passed it 10 times before taking a shot". At halftime, Texas Western led by three points, 34–31.

Kentucky rallied to within a point of Texas Western in the opening three minutes of the second half, but could not catch them even when they had three shots in a row to achieve a tie. Behind scores by Artis and Hill, the Miners recorded six consecutive points to extend their lead. Texas Western maintained their lead with effective free throw shooting; over a 37-minute period, the Miners attempted 27 free throws, making all but one. Texas Western ultimately took a nine-point advantage and was able to control the pace; Gordon S. White Jr. of The New York Times wrote that their margin was "safe enough for the fancy ball-handlers to slow the game during the last three minutes. Dribbles by Cager took the final few seconds off of the clock, as the Miners won 72–65 to earn the NCAA University Division title. It was the school's first men's college basketball championship, and remains their only one as of the 2021–22 season. Texas Western was the first school from Texas to win a men's national championship, and remained the only one until Baylor in 2021.

== Statistical summary ==
Hill was the game's leading scorer with 20 points, on 7-of-17 shooting. Lattin added 16 points for the Miners, while Artis had 15 points; both players were perfect on free throws, as Lattin made all of his six attempts and Artis converted five. Lattin recorded nine rebounds on the night, while Artis had eight and Willie Cager contributed six. For the Wildcats, Riley and Dampier each tallied 19 points. Conley, with 10 points, was the only other Kentucky player to record double-digit points on the night. Dampier matched Lattin's total of nine rebounds, and Conley and Tommy Kron had eight and seven respectively.

Texas Western converted 22 of their 49 field goal attempts, for a 44.9% total. The team made more than 80% of their free throws, missing only six of 34 attempts. Kentucky's shooters were held to 38.6% shooting in the game, making 27 of 70 field goals. The Wildcats were successful on all but two of their free throws, but they had 21 fewer attempts than the Miners. Kentucky committed nearly twice as many fouls (23) as Texas Western, who had 12 fouls called against them. Two Kentucky players – Conley and Thad Jaracz – fouled out of the game, while two others ended the contest with four fouls. Texas Western had a 35–33 rebounding advantage for the game.

== Aftermath ==
The 1966 NCAA University Division Championship Game is primarily remembered for Texas Western's victory with its entirely African-American starting lineup, which challenged stereotypes of the era. At the time, it was commonly believed that teams with all-black lineups would not play with self-control; Perry Wallace, the first black basketball player to compete in the SEC, said, "There was a certain style of play whites expected from blacks." Before the game, the Miners were portrayed in the media as a team with weak defending and an up-tempo offense, when their actual playing style was vastly different. Worsley said that "We were more white-oriented than any of the other teams in the Final Four," in terms of playing with discipline. After leading Texas Western to the championship, Haskins received many racist letters, along with some claiming that he was exploiting black players. According to Haskins, death threats were made against the Miners before a game against SMU the following season.

The 1966–67 Wildcats finished with a 13–13 record, following a back injury suffered by Riley in the offseason that limited his effectiveness. A victory over Alabama in the last game of the season was required to prevent Rupp from having more losses than wins for the first time. Rupp coached Kentucky for five more seasons, through 1971–72. His teams made the NCAA Tournament in each of the five seasons, but were unable to reach the Final Four. Texas Western entered 1966–67 ranked second in the country, and remained in the top 10 throughout the season. The Miners were defeated by Pacific in their second NCAA tournament game and finished at 22–6. That year, the school was renamed to the University of Texas at El Paso, its current name. It took three seasons for UTEP to return to the NCAA Tournament; Haskins coached the Miners through the 1998–99 season.

In the first season after the 1966 title game, all conferences in the Southern U.S. featured at least one black men's basketball player. This marked a change from the 1965–66 season, when numerous Southern conferences, such as the SEC and Atlantic Coast Conference, had not yet integrated. (Note: Less than two weeks before the championship game, on March 7, the SEC saw its first African American varsity athlete when Stephen Martin, a sophomore baseball player at Tulane, made his varsity debut in the team's season opener. However, Martin was largely forgotten as an SEC integration pioneer because he was then a walk-on, and Tulane would leave the SEC immediately after the 1966 baseball season.) Large college programs began to more actively recruit African Americans for their basketball rosters, removing unofficial quotas that had been in place. By 1985, the number of black players in Division I more than doubled. Kirkpatrick wrote that the game "changed the sport forever. And maybe changed a nation as well."

Texas Western was the only team from Texas to win the national championship in basketball until Baylor did so in 2021.
