= 1965–66 Texas Western Miners men's basketball team =

American college basketball season

1965–66 Texas Western Miners men's basketball
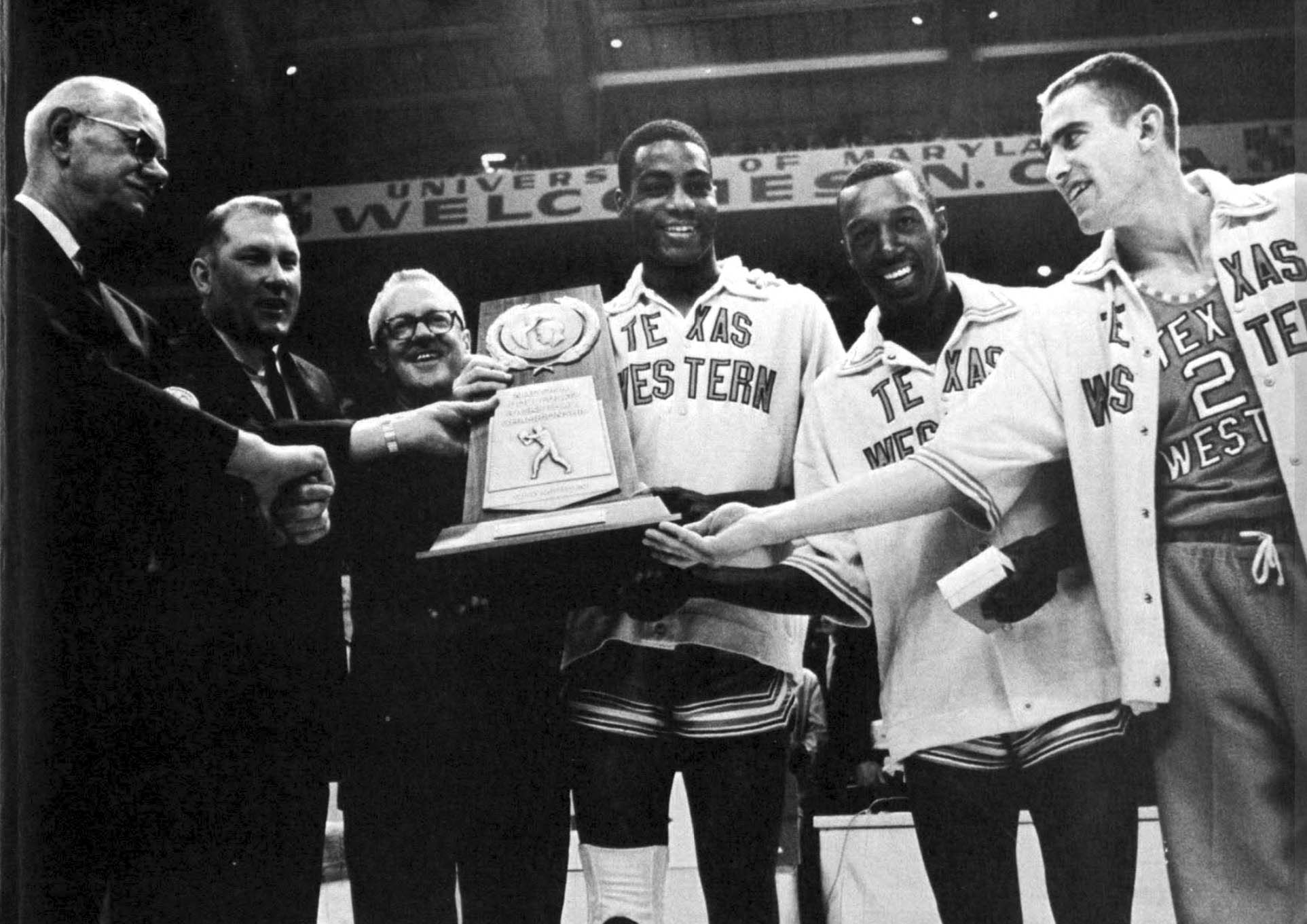

NCAA tournament National champions

National Championship Game, W 72–65 vs. Kentucky
- Conference: Independent

Ranking
- Coaches: No. 3
- AP: No. 3
- Record: 28–1
- Head coach: Don Haskins (5th season)
- Assistant coach: Moe Iba (4th season)
- Home arena: Memorial Gym

1965–66 NCAA University Division men's basketball independents standings
	Conf.				Overall
Team	W		L	PCT	W		L	PCT
No. 3 Texas Western		–		–	28	–	1	.966
No. 6 Loyola Chicago		–		–	22	–	3	.880
Oklahoma City		–		–	24	–	5	.828
Providence		–		–	22	–	5	.815
Boston College		–		–	21	–	5	.808
Dayton		–		–	23	–	6	.793
Houston		–		–	23	–	6	.793
Fairfield		–		–	19	–	5	.792
VPI		–		–	19	–	5	.792
Syracuse		–		–	22	–	6	.786
Hardin–Simmons		–		–	20	–	6	.769
Penn State		–		–	18	–	6	.750
Rutgers		–		–	17	–	7	.708
St. Bonaventure		–		–	16	–	7	.696
Army		–		–	18	–	8	.692
DePaul		–		–	18	–	8	.692
St. John's		–		–	18	–	8	.692
Detroit		–		–	17	–	8	.680
Georgetown		–		–	16	–	8	.667
Colorado State		–		–	14	–	8	.636
Villanova		–		–	18	–	11	.621
Butler		–		–	16	–	10	.615
Seattle		–		–	16	–	10	.615
Duquesne		–		–	14	–	9	.609
Miami (FL)		–		–	15	–	11	.577
Denver		–		–	14	–	11	.560
Florida State		–		–	14	–	11	.560
Air Force		–		–	14	–	12	.538
Creighton		–		–	14	–	12	.538
Marquette		–		–	14	–	12	.538
Georgia Tech		–		–	13	–	13	.500
Xavier		–		–	13	–	13	.500
Loyola (LA)		–		–	12	–	12	.500
Centenary		–		–	12	–	14	.462
Utah State		–		–	12	–	14	.462
Niagara		–		–	11	–	13	.458
Holy Cross		–		–	10	–	13	.435
Fordham		–		–	10	–	15	.400
Memphis State		–		–	10	–	15	.400
Navy		–		–	7	–	12	.368
Colgate		–		–	8	–	14	.364
Canisius		–		–	7	–	15	.318
Saint Francis (PA)		–		–	8	–	18	.308
West Texas State		–		–	6	–	17	.261
Portland		–		–	6	–	19	.240
Pittsburgh		–		–	5	–	17	.227
Notre Dame		–		–	5	–	21	.192
Boston University		–		–	4	–	19	.174
New Mexico State		–		–	4	–	22	.154
Rankings from AP Poll

The 1965–66 Texas Western Miners basketball team represented Texas Western College, now the University of Texas at El Paso (UTEP), led by Hall of Fame head coach Don Haskins. The team won the national championship in 1966, becoming the first team with an all-black starting lineup to do so. The Miners only lost one game, a road loss to Seattle by two points. They won their games by an average of 15.2 points.

The Miners beat Kentucky (an all-white program until 1969) 72–65 in the historic championship game, played on Saturday, March 19, at Cole Field House on the University of Maryland campus in College Park, a suburb of Washington, D.C.

The team was inducted into the Naismith Memorial Basketball Hall of Fame in 2007 and inspired the book and film Glory Road.

== Roster ==
1965–66 Texas Western Miners men's basketball team
Players
Coaches

Pos.	#	Name	Height	Weight	Year	Hometown
F	10	Willie Cager	6 ft 5 in (1.96 m)	—	So	New York City, NY
G	14	Bobby Joe Hill	5 ft 10 in (1.78 m)	—	Jr	Detroit, MI
G	15	Dave Palacio	6 ft 2 in (1.88 m)	—	So	El Paso, TX
F	52	Jerry Armstrong	6 ft 4 in (1.93 m)	—	Sr	Eagleville, MO
F	22	Louis Baudoin	6 ft 7 in (2.01 m)	—	Jr	Albuquerque, NM
G	20	Orsten Artis	6 ft 1 in (1.85 m)	—	Sr	Gary, IN
G	24	Willie Worsley	5 ft 6 in (1.68 m)	—	So	New York City, NY
G	25	Togo Railey	6 ft 0 in (1.83 m)	—	Jr	El Paso, TX
F	31	Dick Myers	6 ft 4 in (1.93 m)	—	Jr	Peabody, KS
C	32	Nevil Shed	6 ft 8 in (2.03 m)	—	Jr	New York City, NY
C	43	David Lattin	6 ft 6 in (1.98 m)	—	So	Houston, TX
F	44	Harry Flournoy	6 ft 5 in (1.96 m)	—	Sr	Gary, IN

Head coach

- Don Haskins (Oklahoma A&M)

Assistant coach(es)

- Moe Iba (Oklahoma State)

Legend

- (C) Team captain
- (S) Suspended
- (I) Ineligible
- (W) Walk-on
- Injured
- Current redshirt

=== After the championship ===
The 1965–66 Texas Western basketball team faced many issues due to racism. For example, when they won the championship no one brought out a ladder for them to cut down the net. Nevil Shed had to hoist up Willie Worsley so he could do the honors. Also, they were not invited on The Ed Sullivan Show, which was customary for the NCAA Champions. Texas Western's (UTEP's) winning the basketball national championship helped promote the desegregation of athletics in the Southeastern Conference which had its first black basketball player in 1967.

As for their professional outlooks following this season, only David Lattin would end up playing in a NBA regular season game, after being selected as a Top 10 pick by the San Francisco Warriors in the 1967 NBA draft. After spending a year in San Francisco, he would be called up by the Phoenix Suns in the 1968 NBA expansion draft and play a season with them before spending the rest of his professional career in the early 1970s in the rivaling upstart American Basketball Association, playing his final years with the Pittsburgh Condors and Memphis Tams before retiring in 1973. Willie Worsley would later join the ABA, playing for the New York Nets in only the second season of that leagues existence before retiring altogether. A couple of other players in Willie Cager and Nevil Shed would also get drafted in the NBA as well, though unlike with Lattin, neither would play in a regular season game. Finally, the rest of the roster would not even touch the NBA or the ABA themselves following this season onward.

== Schedule ==
Date time, TV	Rank^{#}	Opponent^{#}	Result	Record	Site city, state
Regular Season
December 4, 1965*		Eastern New Mexico	W 89–38	1–0	Memorial Gym; El Paso, TX
December 9, 1965*		East Texas State	W 73–51	2–0	Memorial Gym; El Paso, TX
December 11, 1965*		Pan American	W 67–47	3–0	Memorial Gym; El Paso, TX
December 14, 1965*		Weber State	W 74–63	4–0	Memorial Gym; El Paso, TX
December 17, 1965*		Fresno State	W 75–73	5–0	Memorial Gym; El Paso, TX
December 18, 1965*		Fresno State	W 83–65	6–0	Memorial Gym (4,601); El Paso, TX
December 21, 1965*		vs. South Dakota; Mississippi Valley Cage Classic First round	W 88–42	7–0	Rock Island Fieldhouse; Rock Island, IL
December 22, 1965*		vs. Nevada; Mississippi Valley Cage Classic Championship	W 86–49	8–0	Rock Island Fieldhouse (3,600); Rock Island, IL
December 29, 1965*		Loyola (LA); Sun Bowl Tournament	W 93–56	9–0	Memorial Gym; El Paso, TX
December 30, 1965*		No. 4 Iowa; Sun Bowl Tournament	W 86–68	10–0	Memorial Gym; El Paso, TX
January 3, 1966*		Tulsa	W 63–54	11–0	Memorial Gym; El Paso, TX
January 6, 1966*	No. 9	Seattle	W 76–64	12–0	Memorial Gym; El Paso, TX
January 27, 1966*	No. 6	at Arizona State	W 84–67	13–0	Sun Devil Gym; Tempe, AZ
January 29, 1966*	No. 6	West Texas State	W 69–50	14–0	Memorial Gym; El Paso, TX
February 1, 1966*	No. 6	New Mexico State	W 104–78	15–0	Memorial Gym; El Paso, TX
February 4, 1966*	No. 6	at Colorado State	W 68–66	16–0	South College Gymnasium; Fort Collins, CO
February 10, 1966*	No. 4	at Arizona	W 81–72	17–0	Bear Down Gym; Tucson, AZ
February 12, 1966*	No. 4	at New Mexico	W 67–64 ^{OT}	18–0	Johnson Gymnasium; Albuquerque, NM
February 14, 1966*	No. 4	Arizona State	W 69–67	19–0	Memorial Gym; El Paso, TX
February 19, 1966*	No. 3	at Pan American	W 65–61	20–0	Edinburg, TX
February 24, 1966*	No. 3	at West Texas State	W 78–64	21–0	Canyon, TX
February 26, 1966*	No. 3	Colorado State	W 72–55	22–0	Memorial Gym; El Paso, TX
March 2, 1966*	No. 2	at New Mexico State	W 73–56	23–0	Las Cruces High School; Las Cruces, NM
March 5, 1966*	No. 2	at Seattle	L 72–74	23–1	Seattle Center Coliseum; Seattle, WA
NCAA Tournament
March 6, 1966*	No. 2	vs. Oklahoma City; Regional quarterfinal	W 89–74	24–1	WSU Fieldhouse; Wichita, KS
March 11, 1966*	No. 3	vs. Cincinnati; Regional semifinal	W 78–76 ^{OT}	25–1	Lubbock Municipal Coliseum; Lubbock, TX
March 12, 1966*	No. 3	vs. No. 4 Kansas; Elite Eight	W 81–80 ^{2OT}	26–1	Lubbock Municipal Coliseum; Lubbock, TX
March 18, 1966*	No. 3	vs. Utah; National semifinal	W 85–78	27–1	Cole Field House (14,253); College Park, MD
March 19, 1966*	No. 3	vs. No. 1 Kentucky; National Championship	W 72–65	28–1	Cole Field House (14,253); College Park, MD
*Non-conference game. ^{#}Rankings from AP Poll. (#) Tournament seedings in parentheses. All times are in Mountain time.
