= Bobby Joe Hill =

American basketball player (1943–2002)

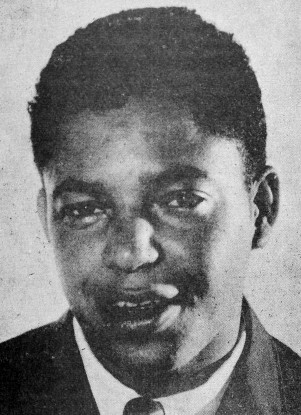
- Hill in 1966

Personal information
- Born: June 12, 1943 Highland Park, Michigan, U.S.
- Died: December 8, 2002 (aged 59) El Paso, Texas, U.S.
- Listed height: 5 ft 11 in (1.80 m)
- Listed weight: 175 lb (79 kg)

Career information
- High school: Highland Park (Highland Park, Michigan)
- College: UTEP (1961–1966)
- NBA draft: 1966: undrafted
- Position: Guard

Career highlights
- NCAA champion (1966)

Tyrone Bobby Joe Hill (June 12, 1943 – December 8, 2002) was an American basketball player and was the leading scorer of the 1965–66 Texas Western College (now the University of Texas at El Paso) team, helping the Miners win the 1966 NCAA basketball championship. The victory is considered one of the most important wins in American sports history – Texas Western started an all-black starting lineup, against the all-white University of Kentucky.

Bobby Joe Hill was the 5'11 point guard from Highland Park, Michigan on the Texas Western college basketball team that won the national title in 1966. Texas Western's win over the top-ranked Kentucky team, nicknamed "Rupp's Runts," in the title game in College Park, Maryland, is considered one of the most historic games in the annals of college basketball. The school's all-black starting five defeated a white Kentucky team, 72–65. Bobby Joe Hill was one of the most prominent players on the court. In the first half, he stole the ball from both Louie Dampier and Tommy Kron twice within the span of a minute and converted both steals into easy layups. He led all scorers with twenty points, and his plays were complemented by talented teammates Harry Flournoy, Nevil Shed, David Lattin, and Willie Worsley. Don Haskins coached Texas Western, and Adolph Rupp directed Kentucky.

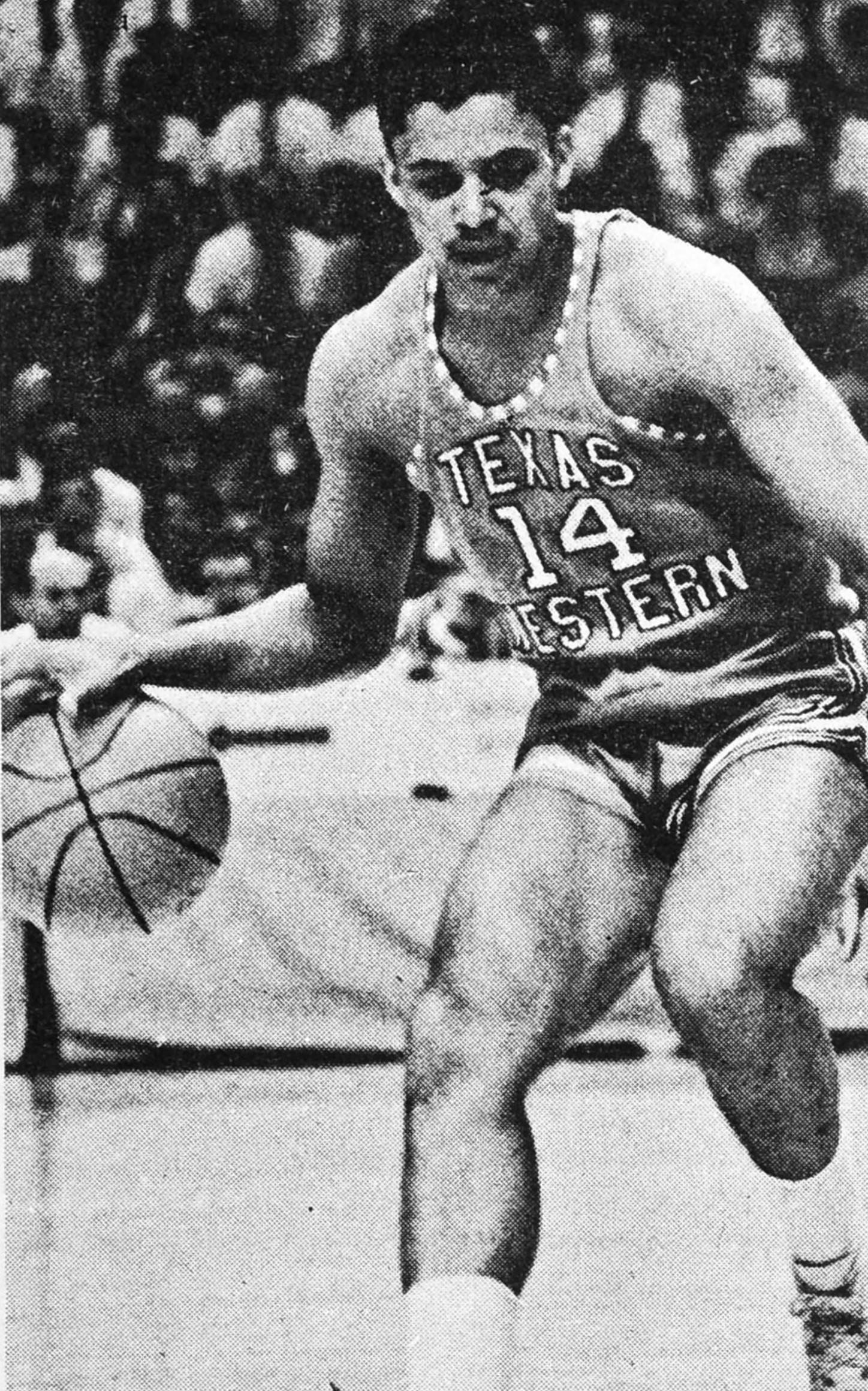
Hill with Texas Western

The Miners' victory over the Kentucky Wildcats has been described as a landmark event in the history of civil right and sports desegregation, comparable to Jackie Robinson's baseball tenure with the Brooklyn Dodgers, and proving that color of skin has no bearing on talent and ability. Of note is that Don Haskins and the entire Texas Western squad faced racial threats, insults, vandalism, and violence throughout the 1965–1966 season before ultimately achieving their against-all-odds triumph.

Bobby Joe Hill stayed in El Paso after his Texas Western career, married his college sweetheart Waltina Malachi in 1966. He retired as an executive with El Paso Natural Gas, and died in 2002 of a heart attack at age 59, the first player from the starting lineup to die. Bobby Joe Hill is interred at Restlawn Memorial Park in El Paso, Texas.

The story of Bobby Joe Hill and the 1966 Texas Western national championship has been immortalized in the film Glory Road, which was released in the U.S. in January, 2006. Derek Luke was cast to play Bobby Joe in the movie.
