= Jones-Hill House =

Collegiate sports training complex at the University of Maryland

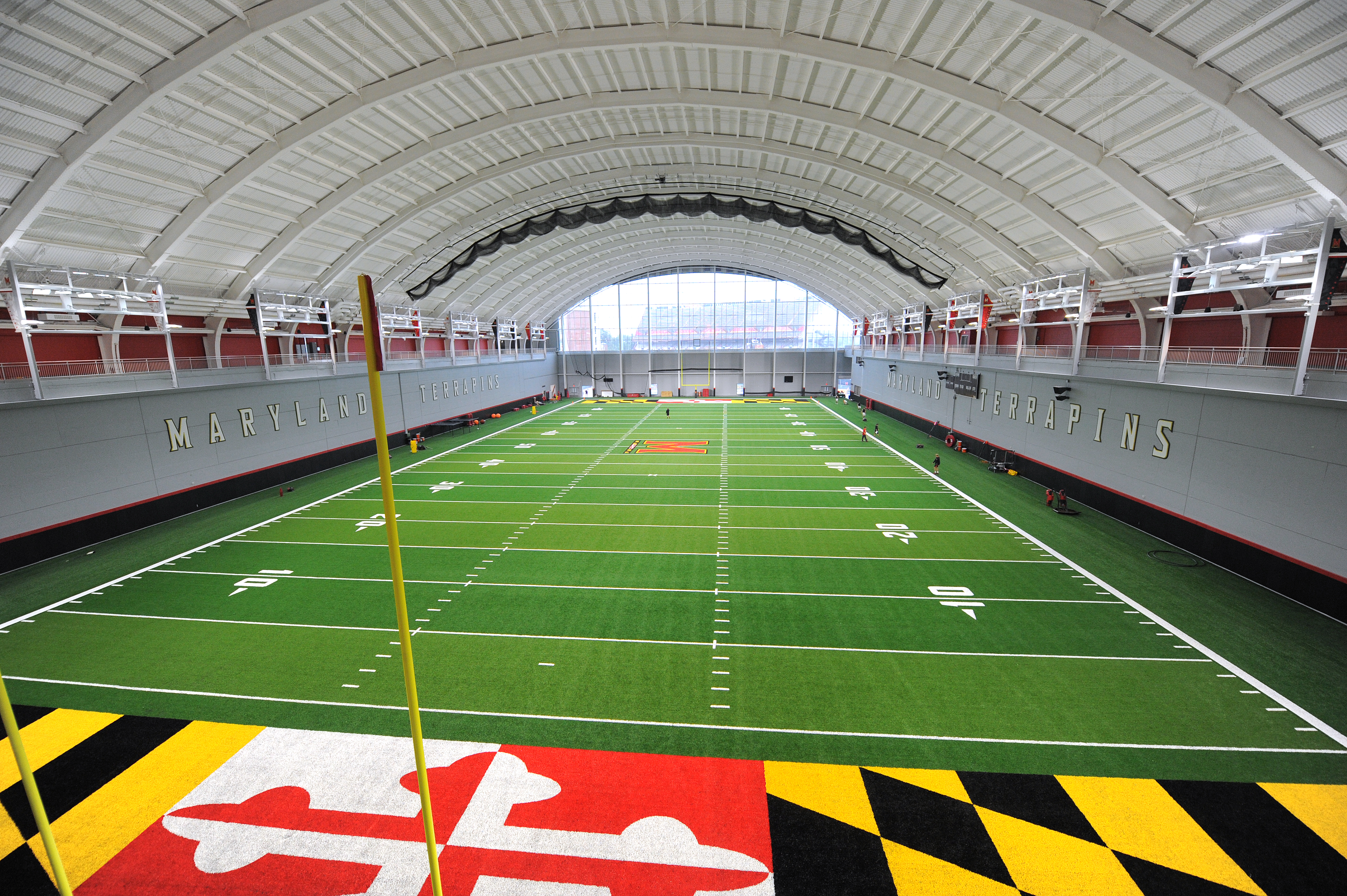
- Interior of the facility in 2017
- Interactive map of Jones-Hill House
- Former names: Cole Field House (1956–2021); Student Activities Building (1955–1956)
- Address: 4095 Union Lane
- Location: University of Maryland; College Park, Maryland, U.S.
- Coordinates: 38°59′16.6″N 76°56′48.1″W
- Elevation: 70 feet (21 m) AMSL
- Owner: University of Maryland
- Operator: University of Maryland Athletics
- Type: Sports center
- Current use: Strength training

Construction
- Groundbreaking: 1952
- Opened: December 2, 1955; 70 years ago
- Cost: $3.3 million ($39.7 million in 2025); $196 million (renovation)
- Architect: CannonDesign (renovation)

Tenants
- Maryland Terrapins men's basketball (NCAA) (1955–2002); Maryland Terrapins women's basketball (NCAA) (1971–2002); Maryland Maniacs (IFL) (2010)

Website
- umterps.com/joneshillhouse

The Jones-Hill House is an indoor collegiate sports training complex located on the campus of the University of Maryland in College Park, Maryland, United States, a suburb north of Washington, D.C. In the center of the campus on 14.5 acres (5.9 ha) of land, it is adjacent to SECU Field, near Stamp Student Union and McKeldin Library. Constructed between 1952 and 1955 at a cost of $3.3 million ($39.7 million in 2025), the venue served for nearly a half-century as the home court of the Maryland Terrapins men's and women's basketball teams. Formerly named the William P. Cole Jr. Student Activities Building and commonly known as Cole Field House, it was renamed in April 2021 in honor of Billy Jones and Darryl Hill, the first Black men to integrate basketball and football at Maryland, respectively.

A multi-phase, $196 million renovation commenced in 2015 to transform the capacity 14,956-seat basketball arena into a 356,000-square-foot (33,100 m^{2}) sports and academic complex that includes an indoor practice facility and operations center for the university's football program, a sports science and sports medical research center, and an incubator for entrepreneurs.

The Jones-Hill House, the indoor practice facility and operations center for the Maryland Terrapins football team (Big Ten Conference), opened in 2017. Though the facility is primarily used for football, it was also used for training by the men's and women's lacrosse teams The second phase of renovation, which began in late-2017, includes the construction of a 196,000-square-foot (18,200 m^{2}) addition to the complex. This new structure will also include a space for the Academy for Innovation and Entrepreneurship and the Center for Sports Medicine, Health and Human Performance, a sports medicine education, investigation and clinical care center operated in partnership with the University of Maryland, Baltimore.

== Jones-Hill House ==
Jones-Hill House, the 160,000-square-foot (15,000 m^{2}) indoor practice facility, opened in August 2017 and features a full-length, 100-yard-long FieldTurf football field with a goal post at each end surrounded by an elevated concourse. With a nearly 90-foot (27 m) height clearance from the field to the center of the roof, the facility ranks among the highest headrooms in any NCAA practice facility. When completed, the facility will include two full-length outdoor football practice fields, locker rooms, a 26,000-square-foot (2,400 m^{2}) strength and conditioning center, hydrotherapy and other training facilities, a 180-seat theater-style team meeting room, position meeting rooms, a 230-seat cafeteria, recruiting lounge, and staff offices for the university's football program. A tunnel will connect the Cole Field House Performance Center to Capital One Field at SECU Stadium.

== Center for Sports Medicine Health and Human Performance ==
The Center for Sports Medicine Health and Human Performance is an academic research center operated in partnership with the University of Maryland School of Medicine in Baltimore as part of the MPowering the State initiative. The Center studies the treatment of sports-related conditions, including neuroscience with a specific focus on concussions and traumatic brain injury. The facility will also be a treatment center for an array of sports injuries. The Center will initially occupy a 40,000-square-foot (3,700 m^{2}) space within the Cole Field House complex, with plans to expand to a total of 60,000 square feet (5,600 m2) of space.

== History ==
Cole Field House opened in 1955 as the Student Activities Building, a 12,000-seat basketball arena. The $3.3 million facility was constructed was the second-largest basketball arena on the East Coast, behind only Madison Square Garden in New York City. The first basketball event was played on December 2, 1955, when the host Terrapins beat the Virginia Cavaliers 67–55 in an Atlantic Coast Conference (ACC) regular season matchup. The structure was renamed the William P. Cole Jr. Student Activities Building in 1956 in honor of Judge William P. Cole Jr., chairman of the university's Board of Regents from 1944 to 1956. The first head coach to call the facility home was Bud Millikan; in the late 1960s, head coach Lefty Driesell added nearly 3,000 seats around the court raising the hometown decibel level.

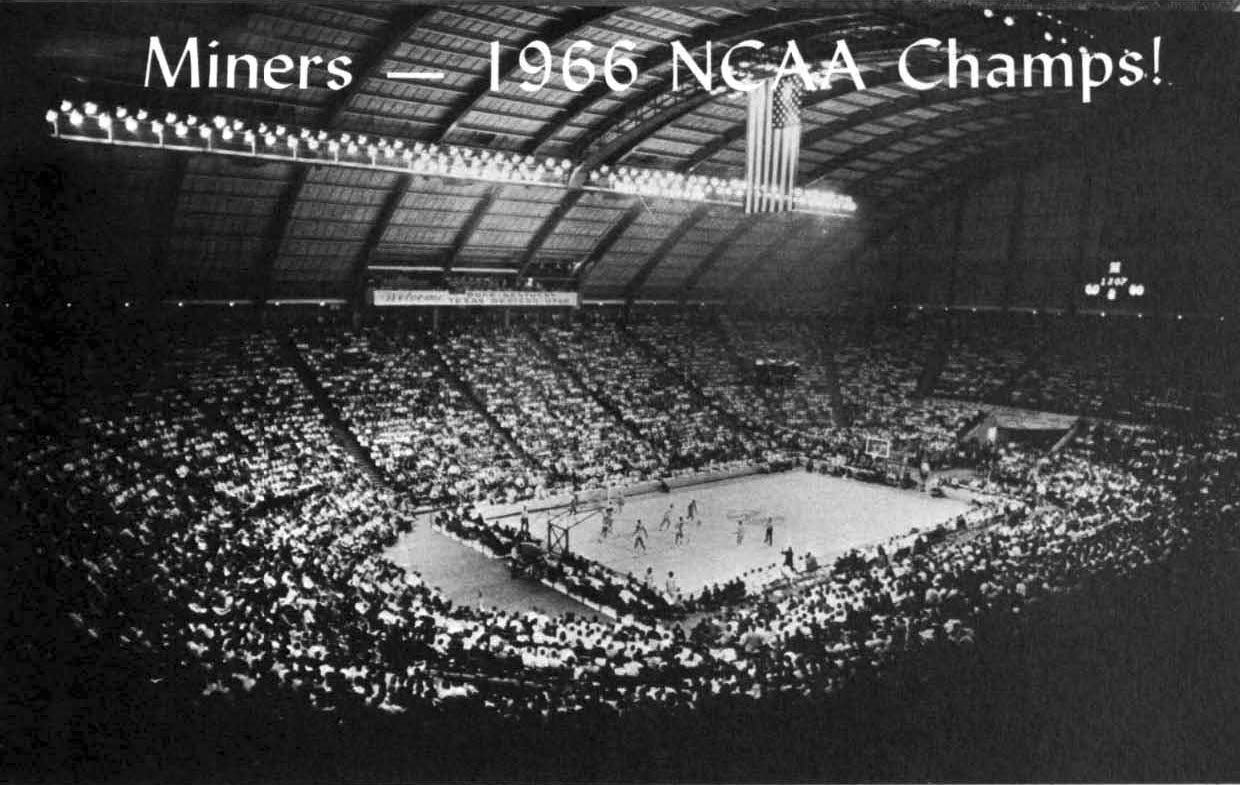
1966 NCAA Tournament final

Cole Field House was the host site of the NCAA basketball tournament East Region finals in 1962, when New York University defeated St. John's in the regional final, 94–85. The NCAA Final Four was first hosted at the facility in 1966 and featured the Duke Blue Devils, Kentucky Wildcats, Texas Western (now UTEP Miners), and Utah Utes. Texas Western (which started all black players) upset Kentucky's all-white team 72–65 before 14,253 spectators. Future hall of fame head coach Gary Williams, then a student, attended the game. The Final Four returned four years later in 1970. In 1991, Cole was the site of the first-ever upset of an NCAA Tournament No. 2-seed by a No. 15-seed, as Richmond defeated heavily favored Syracuse 73–69.

Cole Field House is the site of the most upsets of No. 1-ranked men's basketball teams. The Terrapins accounted for six of the upsets at Cole, while the other one occurred in the 1966 Final Four where No. 3 Texas Western defeated No. 1 Kentucky. The seventh such occurrence was on February 27, 2002, when Maryland defeated No. 1 Duke. The venues which hosted the second- and third-most No. 1 upsets are Notre Dame's Joyce Athletics & Convention Center (six) and Oklahoma's Lloyd Noble Center (five), respectively.

== Replacement ==
In the 1990s, the administration at Maryland followed a trend occurring at other schools in the ACC to seek a new facility that provided more seating and amenities than were present at Cole Field House. However, this decision brought some debate. Coach Gary Williams privately wished the team remain at Cole due to the home court advantage he received. The small, cramped arena made Cole Field House a loud and difficult place for opponents to play in.

The last Maryland men's basketball game played at Cole Field House was on March 3, 2002, when Maryland defeated Virginia 112–92. The team now plays at the Xfinity Center. Overall, 13 men's All-Americans and four women's All-Americans have played at Cole. Maryland men's basketball remained undefeated at Cole during its last season and went on to win the National Championship.

== Former uses ==
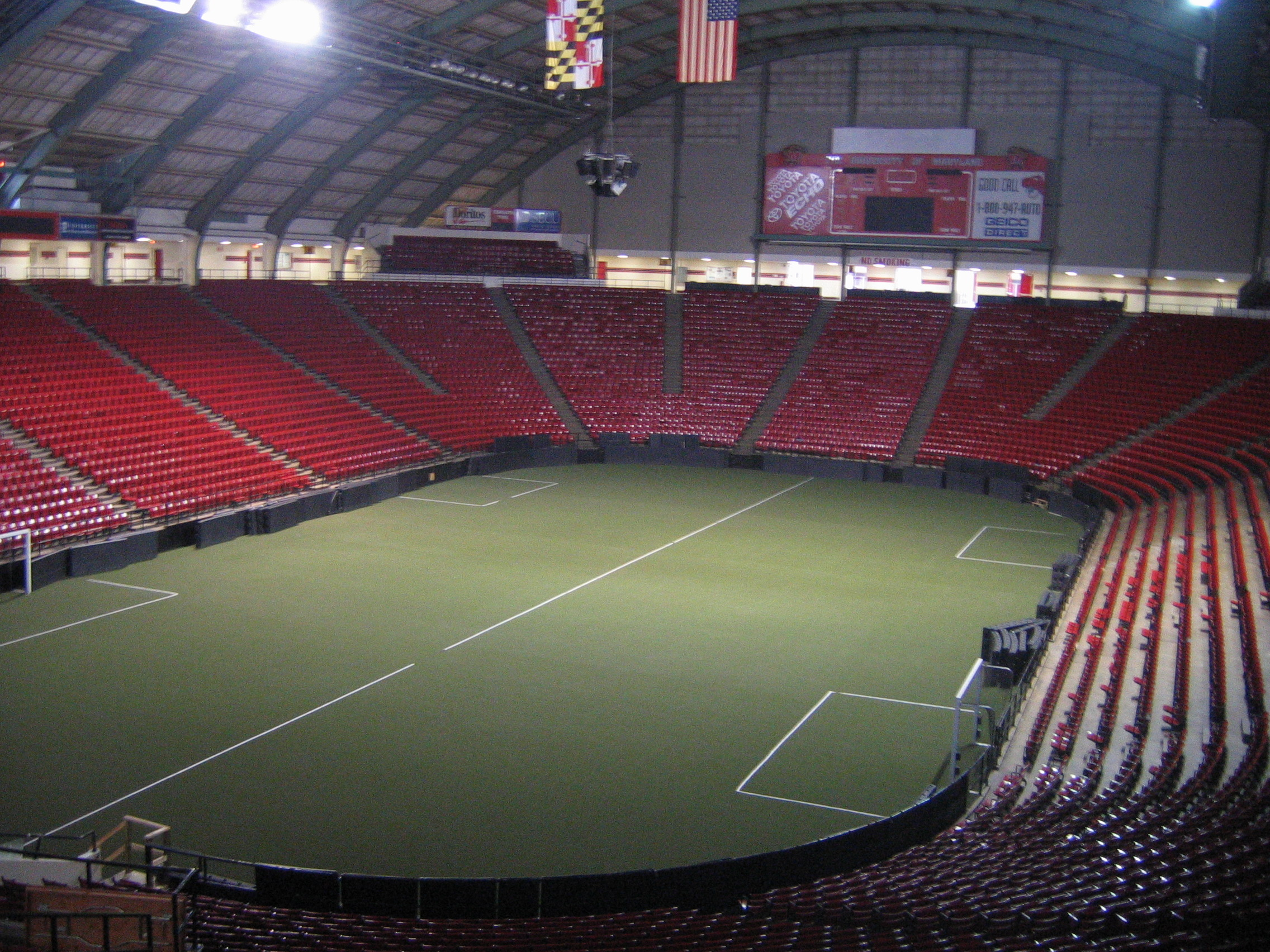
The interior of Cole Field House in 2007

After its basketball teams vacated Cole Field House, the facility was used by the university for intramural athletics and administrative offices. A soccer field constructed atop the basketball court was used as a practice facility by some athletes. The concourse also served as a makeshift track for students, faculty, and other members of the University community. When not used for athletics, the building was used for Homecoming events, classes, and held offices.

The structure had been the subject of speculation for renewal and multiple non-University-related reuses. One such plan was to build a station for the future Purple Line, a light rail line in development by the Maryland Transit Administration. The Maryland Maniacs indoor football team used Cole Field House as its home venue in 2010.

On September 24, 2013, the Maryland Athletic Department announced that the Terrapin men's and women's basketball teams would hold their Maryland Madness event on October 18 at Cole Field House. It marked the first official athletic event hosted in the facility since the Terps' new arena opened in 2002.

== Other notable events ==
- 1965: DeMatha Catholic High School defeated a Power Memorial Academy team led by Lew Alcindor 46–43, ending its 71-game winning streak in front of over 14,000.
- 1966: Texas Western, now the University of Texas at El Paso, defeated a Kentucky Wildcats team led by Adolph Rupp 72–65 to win the national championship. In this game, the victorious Miners were the first basketball team in the NCAA's top level to start five African Americans. Texas Western's victory is considered one of the most important games in the history of college sports.
- 1972: A ping-pong match between the United States and the People's Republic of China is played at Cole, the first sporting event between the two countries.
- 1973: An exhibition of the Soviet gymnastics team, including gold medalist Olga Korbut, sells out the arena and is televised locally in the Washington, D.C. area.
- 1973: The NBA's Capital Bullets (now the Washington Wizards) played November home games at Cole while the team transitioned from Baltimore to Landover. Their new home, Capital Centre, opened on December 2. They had played several home games at Cole during their last seasons in Baltimore.
- September 27 and 28, 1974: Elvis Presley in concert. His first concert appearance in the immediate Washington, D.C. area. The venue proved too small. The Capital Centre in Largo, Maryland was booked in 1976 and 1977.
- January 26, 1975: The first televised women's basketball game is played at Cole. Maryland loses to the defending national champions Immaculata. Some sources report that Immaculata won 80–48, while others report 85–63.
- 1977: Queen plays at Cole.
- 1981: The Grateful Dead played at Cole.
- 1998: Bob Dylan performed at Cole.
- March 2015: The Maryland Wrestling High school State Championships was the last championship event to be contested before its conversion to the headquarters of the Terrapins football team.
- November 5, 2015: Comedian Hannibal Buress performed in what was the last show at Cole before its conversion to the headquarters of the Terrapins football team.

On April 28, 1973, Chuck Berry played at Cole Field House. The show was particularly notable because Berry (who did not employ a full time band) was backed by Bruce Springsteen and the E Street Band.

| Preceded by Memorial Coliseum; Freedom Hall | NCAA Men's Division I Basketball Tournament; Finals Venue; 1966; 1970 | Succeeded by Freedom Hall; Astrodome |
