= UTEP Miners men's basketball =

Men's basketball team of the University of Texas at El Paso

| 2026–27 UTEP Miners men's basketball team |
- University: University of Texas at El Paso
- Head coach: Joe Golding (6th season)
- Location: El Paso, Texas
- Arena: Don Haskins Center (capacity: 12,000)
- Conference: Mountain West
- Nickname: Miners
- Colors: Dark blue, orange, and silver accent
- Student section: Miner Maniacs

NCAA Division I tournament champions
- 1966
Other NCAA Division I tournament results
| Final Four | 1966 |
| Elite Eight | 1966 |
| Sweet Sixteen | 1964, 1966, 1967, 1992 |
| Appearances | 1963, 1964, 1966, 1967, 1970, 1975, 1984, 1985, 1986, 1987, 1988, 1989, 1990, 1992, 2004, 2005, 2010 |

Conference tournament champions
- 1984, 1986, 1989, 1990, 2005

Conference regular-season champions
- 1957, 1959, 1970, 1983, 1984, 1985, 1986, 1987, 1992, 2004, 2010

The UTEP Miners men's basketball team plays for the University of Texas at El Paso in El Paso, Texas. The team is an NCAA Division I men's college basketball team competing in the Mountain West Conference (MW). Home games are played at Don Haskins Center.

== History ==
=== 1966 Texas Western basketball team ===
As Texas Western, the Miners won the 1966 NCAA Division I men's basketball tournament. The 72–65 victory over Kentucky in College Park, Maryland is considered one of the most important in the history of college basketball, as it marked the first time that a team with five African-American starters won a title game. It came against a Kentucky team that had no African-American players, during the period of the Civil Rights Movement.

The title team has been chronicled throughout the American media, including the book And the Walls Came Tumbling Down by Frank Fitzpatrick in 1999 and the 2006 Disney movie Glory Road.

The team was inducted into the Naismith Memorial Basketball Hall of Fame in 2007.

== Postseason ==
=== NCAA tournament results ===
The Miners have appeared in 17 NCAA Tournaments and were the 1966 National Champions. Their combined record is 14–16.

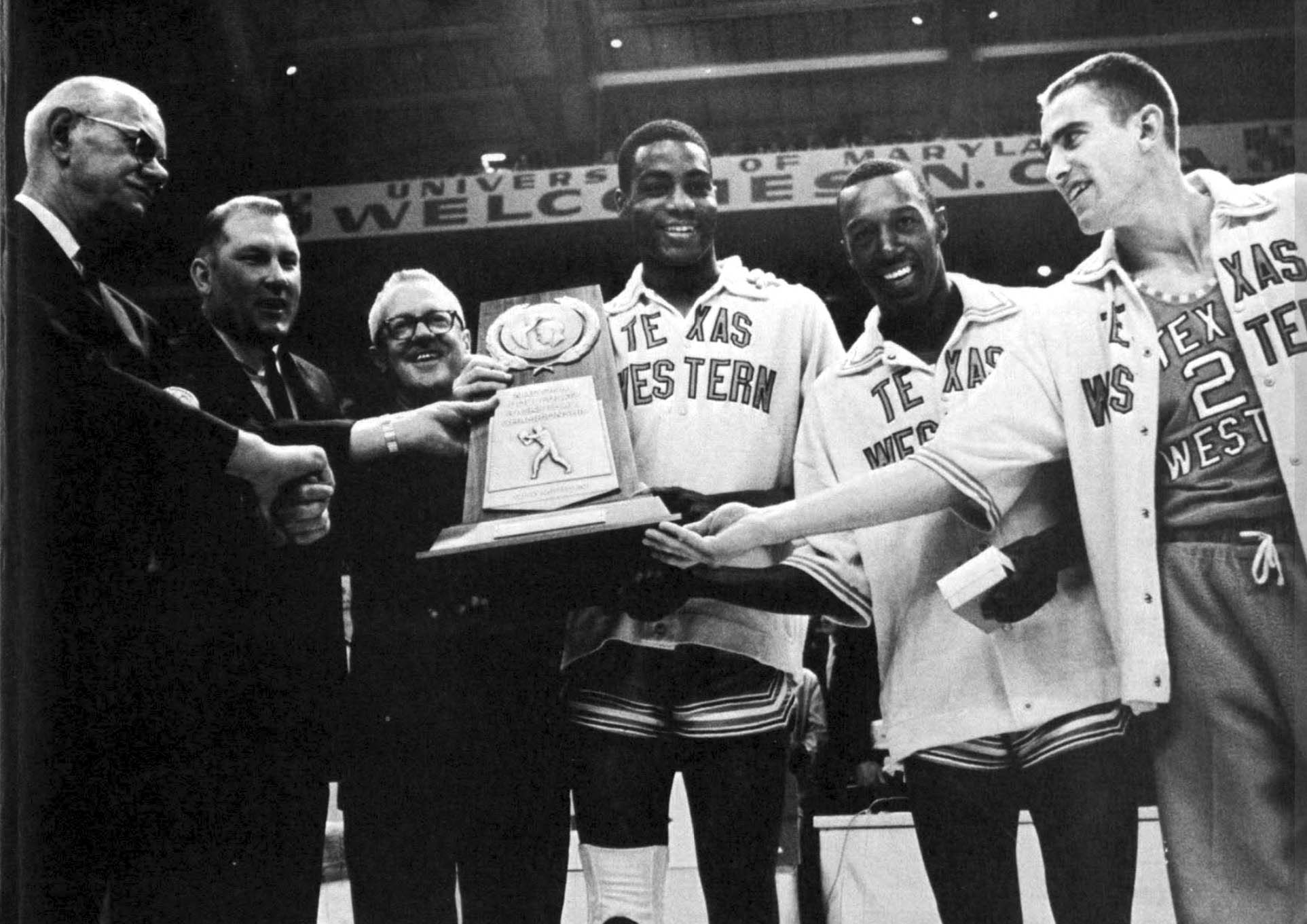
The team that won the 1966 NCAA championship

| Year | Round | Opponent | Result |
|---|---|---|---|
| 1963 | Round of 25 | Texas | L 47–65 |
| 1964 | Round of 25; Sweet Sixteen; Regional third-place game | Texas A&M; Kansas State; Creighton | W 68–62; L 60–64; W 63–52 |
| 1966 | Round of 25; Sweet Sixteen; Elite Eight; Final Four; National Championship | Oklahoma City; Cincinnati; Kansas; Utah; Kentucky | W 89–74; W 78–76; W 81–80; W 85–78; W 72–65 |
| 1967 | Round of 25; Sweet Sixteen; Regional third-place game | Seattle; Pacific; Wyoming | W 62–54; L 63–72; W 69–67 |
| 1970 | First round | Utah State | L 81–91 |
| 1975 | First round | Indiana | L 53–78 |
| 1984* | Second round | UNLV | L 60–73 |
| 1985 | First round Second round | Tulsa; NC State | W 79–75; L 73–86 |
| 1986 | First round | Bradley | L 65–83 |
| 1987 | First round Second round | Arizona; Iowa | W 98–91 ^{OT} L 82–84 |
| 1988 | First round | Seton Hall | L 64–80 |
| 1989 | First round Second round | LSU; Indiana | W 85–74; L 69–92 |
| 1990 | First round | Minnesota | L 61–64 ^{OT} |
| 1992 | First round Second round Sweet Sixteen | Evansville; Kansas; Cincinnati | W 55–50; W 66–60; L 67–69 |
| 2004 | First round | Maryland | L 83–86 |
| 2005 | First round | Utah | L 54–60 |
| 2010 | First round | Butler | L 59–77 |

- Received a first round bye in 1984.

=== NIT results ===
The Miners have appeared in ten National Invitation Tournaments. Their combined record is 6–10.

| Year | Round | Opponent | Result |
|---|---|---|---|
| 1965 | First round | Manhattan | L 53–71 |
| 1972 | First round | Niagara | L 57–76 |
| 1980 | First round Second round | Wichita State; Michigan | W 58–56; L 65–75 |
| 1981 | First round Second round | San Jose State; Tulsa | W 57–53; L 72–76 |
| 1993 | First round Second round | Houston; Georgetown | W 67–61; L 44–71 |
| 1995 | First round Second round | Montana; New Mexico State | W 90–60; L 89–92 |
| 2001 | First round Second round | McNeese State; Memphis | W 84–74; L 65–90 |
| 2006 | Opening Round; First round | Lipscomb; Michigan | W 85–66; L 67–82 |
| 2011 | First round | New Mexico | L 57–69 |
| 2015 | First round | Murray State | L 66–81 |

=== CBI results ===
The Miners have appeared in three College Basketball Invitationals. Their combined record is 4–4 and they advanced to the finals in the 2009 tournament.

| Year | Round | Opponent | Result |
|---|---|---|---|
| 2008 | First round | Utah | L 69–81 |
| 2009 | First round Quarterfinals; Semifinals; Finals Game 1 Finals Game 2 Finals Game 3 | Nevada; Northeastern; Richmond; Oregon State; Oregon State; Oregon State | W 79–77; W 75–66; W 81–69; L 69–75; W 70–63; L 73–81 |
| 2014 | First round | Fresno State | L 56–61 |

=== The Basketball Classic results ===
The Miners have appeared in The Basketball Classic one time. Their record is 1–1.

| Year | Round | Opponent | Result |
|---|---|---|---|
| 2022 | First round Second round | Western Illinois; Southern Utah | W 80-54; L 69-82 |

== Miners in the NBA ==
17 former UTEP players have played at least one game in the NBA.

| Name | Draft Year | Draft Team |
|---|---|---|
| Tiny Archibald | 1970 | Cincinnati Royals |
| Gus Bailey | 1974 | Houston Rockets |
| Jim Barnes | 1964 | New York Knicks |
| Derrick Caracter | 2010 | Los Angeles Lakers |
| Antonio Davis | 1990 | Indiana Pacers |
| Scott English | 1972 | Phoenix Suns |
| Dave Feitl | 1986 | Houston Rockets |
| Greg Foster | 1990 | Washington Bullets |
| Dick Gibbs | 1971 | Chicago Bulls |
| Tim Hardaway | 1989 | Golden State Warriors |
| Vince Hunter | 2017 | Undrafted |
| Dave Lattin | 1967 | San Francisco Warriors |
| Marlon Maxey | 1992 | Minnesota Timberwolves |
| Arnett Moultrie | 2012 | Miami Heat |
| Julyan Stone | 2011 | Undrafted |
| Julian Washburn | 2018 | Undrafted |
| Willie Worsley | 1968 | Undrafted |

== Miners in international professional basketball ==
- McKenzie Moore (born 1992), in the Israeli Basketball Premier League
- Randy Culpepper, currently plays for Scafati Basket of the Italian Serie A2 Basketball League.

Kent Lockhart, a member of the UTEP team in the early 1980s, played for several years in the Australian professional league where he averaged over 25 ppg.

== Retired numbers ==
UTEP has retired six jersey numbers for seven different players.

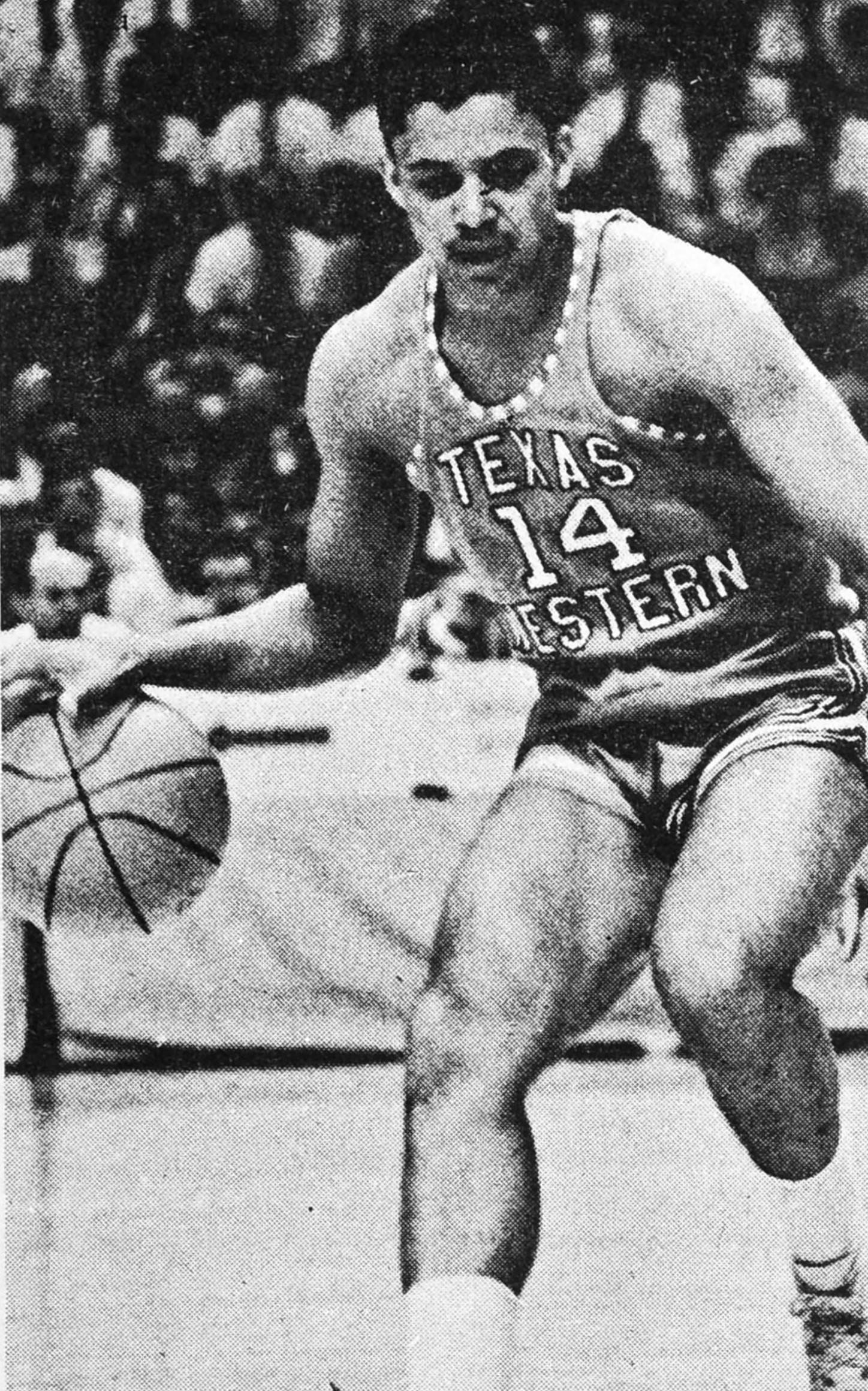
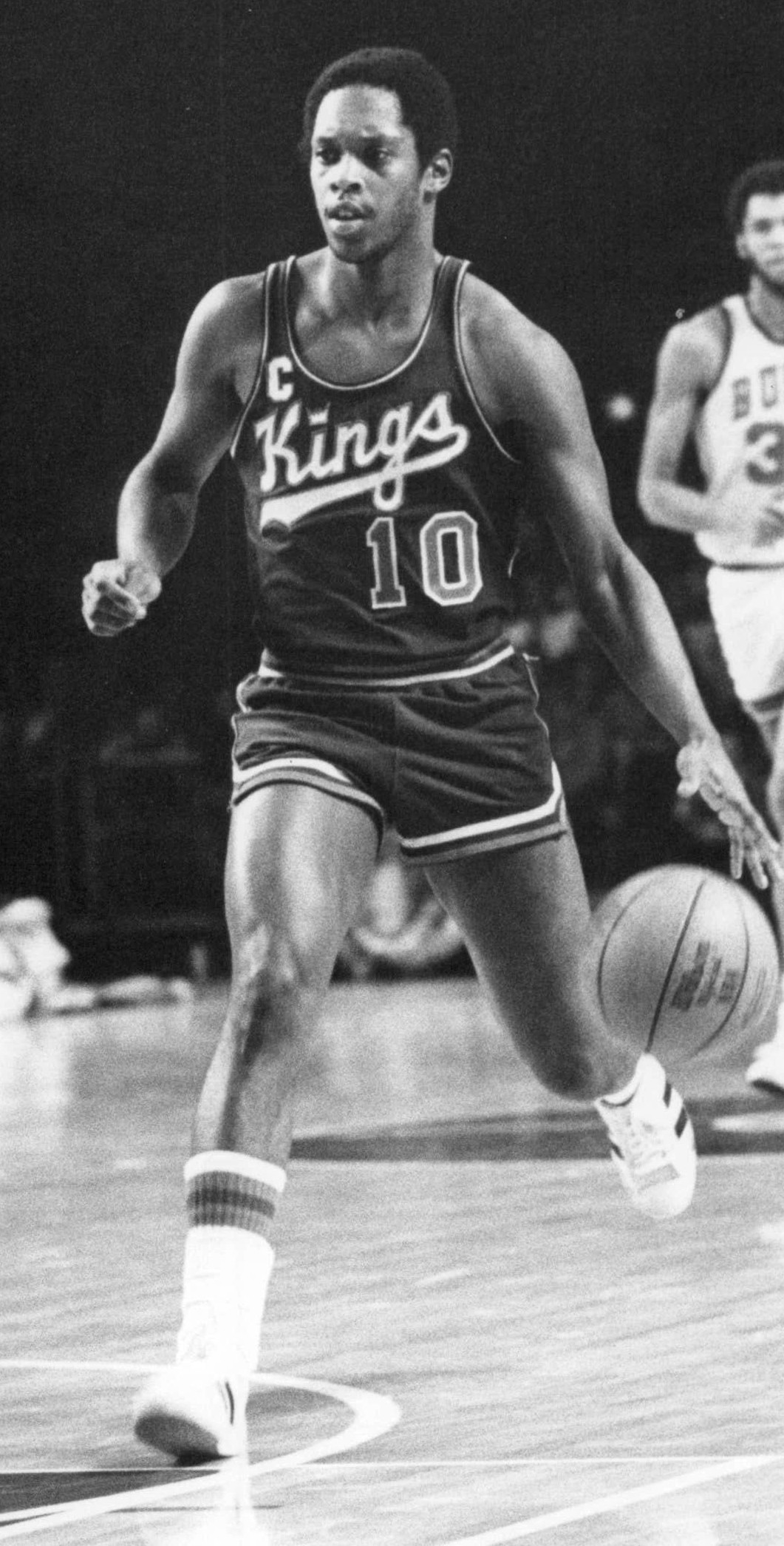
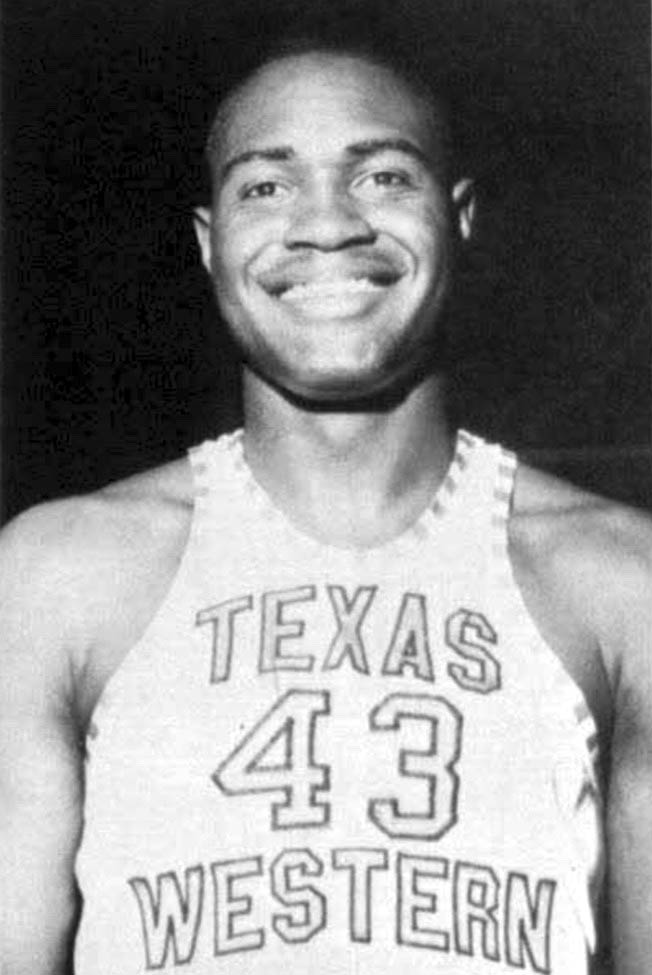
Fltr: Bobby Joe Hill, Nate Archibald, and Dave Lattin, whose numbers were retired by UTEP

UTEP Miners retired numbers
| No. | Player | Position | Career | Ref. |
| 10 | Tim Hardaway | PG | 1985–1989 | |
| 14 | Bobby Joe Hill | PG | 1961–1966 | |
| 14 | Nate Archibald | PG | 1967–1970 | |
| 42 | Nolan Richardson | F | 1961–1964 | |
| 43 | David Lattin | PF/C | 1965–1967 | |
| 44 | Harry Flournoy | F | 1963–1966 | |
| 45 | Jim "Bad News" Barnes | C / PF | 1962–1964 | |

== Basketball Hall of Fame ==
- Nate Archibald
- Tim Hardaway
- Don Haskins
- Nolan Richardson
- 1966 National Championship team

== Don Haskins Center ==
The Don Haskins Center (capacity 11,892) is the home of UTEP Miners basketball. With fans seated extremely close to the playing floor and the UTEP student section located near the opponent's bench, "The Don" is so notorious as a tough place for opponents to win that UTEP has historically had difficulty convincing top-rated teams to play there. The highest ranked team (#5) to lose in the Haskins Center, which was known at the time as the Special Events Center, was Georgetown (coached by John Thompson), who lost 78–64 in December, 1985. The Miners repeated twice in 1986 against Auburn, 87-83. This happened in the Sun Bowl Basketball Tournament. UTEP did this for the third straight year with a win over #5 Wyoming in 1988. "The Don" is the home of the UTEP Miners, who were the first Division I Men's National Basketball Champions in the state of Texas (1966). (Previous home was Memorial Gym.)
