= Glory Road (film) =

2006 American sports drama film by James Gartner

- Theatrical release poster
- Directed by: James Gartner
- Written by: Chris Cleveland; Bettina Gilois
- Produced by: Jerry Bruckheimer
- Starring: Josh Lucas; Derek Luke; Jon Voight
- Cinematography: John Toon; Jeffrey L. Kimball
- Edited by: John Wright; Jason Hellmann
- Music by: Trevor Rabin
- Production companies: Walt Disney Pictures; Jerry Bruckheimer Films; Texas Western Productions; Glory Road Productions
- Distributed by: Buena Vista Pictures Distribution
- Release date: January 13, 2006
- Running time: 118 minutes
- Country: United States
- Language: English
- Budget: $30 million
- Box office: $42.9 million

Glory Road is a 2006 American sports drama film directed by James Gartner (in his feature directorial debut), based on a true story surrounding the events leading to the 1966 NCAA University Division Basketball Championship. Don Haskins portrayed by Josh Lucas, head coach of Texas Western College (now known as University of Texas at El Paso or UTEP), coached a team with an all-black starting lineup, a first in NCAA history. Glory Road explores racism, discrimination and student athletics. Supporting actors Derek Luke and Jon Voight also star in principal roles.

The film was a co-production between the motion picture studios of Walt Disney Pictures, Jerry Bruckheimer Films, Texas Western Productions, and Glory Road Productions. It was commercially distributed by Buena Vista Pictures Distribution. It premiered in theaters nationwide in the United States on January 13, 2006, grossing $42,938,449 in box office business despite generally mixed reviews from critics. Glory Road was nominated for a number of awards including the Humanitas Prize; the film won the 2006 ESPY Award for Best Sports Movie.

On January 10, 2006, the original motion picture soundtrack was released by the Hollywood Records music label. The soundtrack was composed and orchestrated by musician Trevor Rabin. The DVD release, featuring theatrical trailers, extended interviews with players and colleagues of coach Haskins, and deleted scenes, among other highlights, was released in the U.S. on June 6, 2006.

== Plot ==
Don Haskins is the newly wed men's basketball coach at Texas Western College in El Paso, Texas. Lacking necessary financial resources, he makes an effort to recruit the best players regardless of race to form a team that can compete for a national championship. Some of the young men he brings in possess skill, but are raw in talent when it comes to organized teamwork focusing on defense and ball distribution. In the end, his Texas Western Miners team comprises seven black and five white athletes; a balance that raises eyebrows among university personnel. Haskins puts his players through a rigorous training program, threatening to cut anyone who doesn't work as hard as he demands, while trying to integrate his players into a single team.

Following initial victories against mediocre local teams, Haskins quickly discovers that he has to give his black players more free room on the court. Yet, the more victories his team achieves with its flamboyant style, up until this point rarely seen in college basketball, the more racial hatred mounts on his squad. This culminates in threats to his own family, the beating of a player while on the road and ultimately the vandalism of his team's motel rooms by racists while they are at an away game. Increasingly frightened, the team loses its last game of the regular season after the black players stop playing with passion. Thus, the Texas Western Miners finish the 1966 regular season with a 23–1 record, entering the 1966 NCAA tournament ranked second in the nation.

Going on to the NCAA final, played at College Park, Maryland, they take on the top-ranked University of Kentucky under legendary coach Adolph Rupp. Rupp, with a well-organized and more experienced all-white Wildcats squad, firmly believes that his opponent stands no chance. On the eve of the decisive game, Haskins decides to experiment with a bold strategy, informing his team that he intends to start an all-black lineup in the game, and also only using the two other black players in the rotation.

In the midst of seemingly insurmountable odds, Texas Western encounters mounting problems with forward and team captain Harry Flournoy leaving the game with an injury, and their center David Lattin in foul trouble. In a close game, the Miners narrowly lead at halftime, but finally manage to beat Kentucky 72–65 with some impressive steals, rebounding and passing techniques in the second half. The film ends with the players exiting the plane that brought them back to El Paso to the greeting of a raucous crowd. Due to the victory of the Miners, coach Rupp realizes he was wrong about the black players and changes his policy to allow black players to join the Kentucky team later on.

== Cast ==
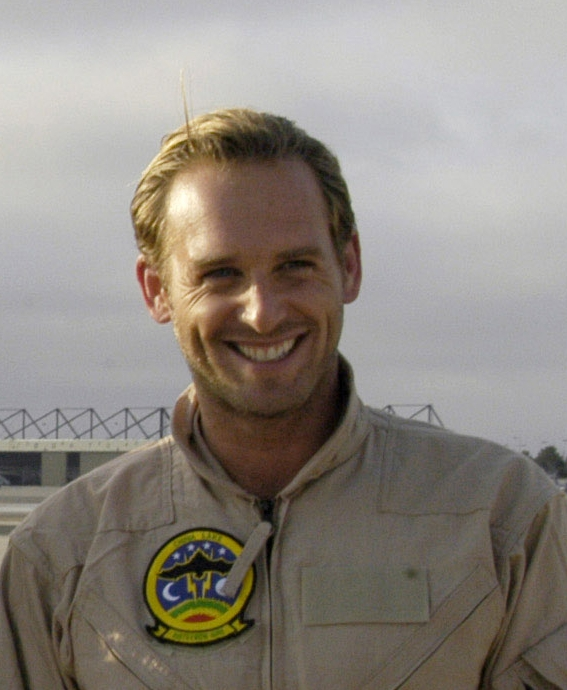
Josh Lucas

- Josh Lucas as Don Haskins
- Derek Luke as Bobby Joe Hill
- Austin Nichols as Jerry Armstrong
- Jon Voight as Adolph Rupp
- Evan Jones as Moe Iba
- Schin A.S. Kerr as David Lattin
- Alphonso McAuley as Orsten Artis
- Mehcad Brooks as Harry Flournoy
- Sam Jones III as Willie Worsley
- Damaine Radcliff as Willie Cager
- Emily Deschanel as Mary Haskins
- Al Shearer as Nevil Shed
- Red West as Ross Moore
- Tatyana Ali as Waltina "Tina" Malichi
- Wilbur Fitzgerald as Wade Richardson
- David Dino Wells Jr. as John Anderson
- Don Haskins as Gas Station Attendant

== Production ==
=== Development ===
Glory Road was inspired by a true story, as described by Texas Western's head coach Don Haskins in his autobiography of the same title, a national bestseller released in 2005 by Hyperion Books. The book details Haskins' early life as a player (including a one-on-one game against a black friend that opened his eyes) and women's basketball coach. Like the film, it then focuses on the 1966 Texas Western men's basketball team and the aftermath of the championship. It was reprinted five times in its first four months of release and was selected as an "Editor's Choice" by the New York Times Book Review. Additionally, Glory Road is the name of a street on the UTEP campus near the Sun Bowl which was renamed to commemorate the 1966 NCAA championship.

Later asked about his decision to start five black players, Haskins downplayed the significance of his decision. "I really didn't think about starting five black guys. I just wanted to put my five best guys on the court. I just wanted to win the game." Though credited with advancing the desegregation of college basketball teams in the South, he wrote in his book "I certainly did not expect to be some racial pioneer or to change the world."

Dunking was banned in the NCAA from 1967 to 1976, not the least due to the success of the Texas Western team and UCLA player Lew Alcindor (better known later as Kareem Abdul-Jabbar), who was just then becoming NCAA varsity eligible.

Next to the closing credits, scenes from interviews with some of the real-life players from the team are shown, including one player from the opposing University of Kentucky team beaten by Texas Western in the NCAA finals, NBA head coach Pat Riley. The real-life Don Haskins was cast as an extra in the film as a gas station attendant, and David Lattin was cast as an extra as a military bartender.

The players on the 1966 team were David Lattin, Bobby Joe Hill, Willie Cager, Willie Worsley, Jerry Armstrong, Orsten Artis, Nevil Shed, Harry Flournoy, Togo Railey, Louis Baudoin, Dick Myers, and David Palacio. The team was nominated in its entirety for the Naismith Memorial Basketball Hall of Fame, and was inducted on September 7, 2007, ten years after coach Don Haskins had already been enshrined.

The movie skipped a crucial game that Texas Western had played. On March 18, 1966, the Miners defeated Utah 85–78 in the Final Four to advance to the national championship game the following night. In the movie the team played against Kansas in the regional final and the following game was the national championship, which is incorrect. In addition, it depicts the sequence of Hill stealing possessions from Kentucky twice in a row as if Kentucky was leading by four, rather than the real result of it leading to the Miners leading 16-11 (incidentally, Texas Western never trailed for the rest of the game).

=== Filming ===
Several scenes in this movie were filmed at the University of Texas at El Paso (UTEP), which is the former Texas Western College, and El Paso High School in El Paso, Texas. Other scenes were filmed at Southeastern Louisiana University in Hammond, Louisiana, Jesuit High School and Douglas High School, formerly F. T. Nicholls High School, in New Orleans, Louisiana, and Chalmette High School in Chalmette, Louisiana. The IHOP scene was filmed in the old Airline Motors Diner on Airline Highway just west of New Orleans. The school shown for the girls' basketball game in Fort Worth, Texas at the beginning of the film is actually the front of El Paso High School, as shown by the engraving on the top of the columns. The lunchroom basketball trash can scene was filmed at Booker T. Washington High School, the first high school built in New Orleans for African-Americans. Towards the beginning of the film for the shot of Texas Western College, the Wells Fargo Plaza and the Chase Bank Building in downtown El Paso can be seen in the top left corner. The Wells Fargo Plaza was not completed until 1971, and the Chase Bank Building was still the Texas Commerce Bank building until the early 1990s. In addition, Ralph Strangis (the former Dallas Stars play-by-play announcer) had a small speaking role as a courtside broadcaster. Ben Affleck was the original choice for the role of coach Don Haskins, but had to drop out of the filming due to prior commitments. NBA point guard Kirk Hinrich was offered a role in the film, but chose not to participate "because of time constraints".

During the scene of the Texas Western-Seattle University basketball game broadcast the announcers inadvertently used the call letters WTSM, which is an FM radio sports station from Tallahassee, Florida instead of the El Paso station KTSM.

=== Controversy ===
Kentucky Wildcat fans and other Rupp supporters said the film at least implicitly portrayed UK coach Adolph Rupp as a racist, with such lines as Bobby Joe Hill's that Rupp would not have recruited him. Like other teams in the Southeastern Conference, Kentucky was all-white, but they were the first and for about a decade the only SEC team to regularly play inter-conference opponents with black players, starting in the 1950s, and took the place of Alabama (1956) and Mississippi State (1959, 1961) in the NCAA Tournament after their respective state legislatures or university leadership refused the invitations because of the possibility of playing against integrated squads. Starting in 1964, Rupp had recruited Kentuckians Wes Unseld and Butch Beard, along with eight other black players who received formal scholarship offers before Tom Payne in 1969 became University of Kentucky first black player. While doing so, he told them (just as Branch Rickey did to Jackie Robinson) about the racial difficulties they could expect in playing in the SEC, and Unseld and Beard went to Louisville instead.

In the game between East Texas State University, now known as Texas A&M University–Commerce, and Texas Western, East Texas State fans are shown throwing popcorn and drinks, and yelling racial epithets. In a later scene, racial slurs are shown painted onto the hotel rooms of the black Texas Western players. After verification that the events never took place, Texas A&M–Commerce asked for an apology from Disney and the makers of the film. Disney did not directly apologize; rather, it explained that the movie was not a documentary and that it had been necessary to consolidate events given the time limitations of the film, and that Disney did not intentionally set out to misrepresent any group and was sorry for any misunderstanding. The President of Texas A&M–Commerce said that, given the way the school was shown in the film, it was hard to believe that Disney could plausibly argue that the portrayal of the school was unintentional. The scene even prompted the Texas state senate to consider a bill which would allow financial assistance from the state to be withheld for films that portray the state negatively.

=== Soundtrack ===
On January 10, 2006, the soundtrack was released on the Hollywood Records label. The film score was orchestrated by musician Trevor Rabin and features music composed by various artists.

Glory Road Original Soundtrack

Film score by Various Artists
- Released: January 10, 2006
- Recorded: 2005
- Length: 32:43
- Label: Hollywood

Glory Road Original Soundtrack
No.	Title	Length
1.	"People Get Ready"	2:43
2.	"Ain't That Peculiar"	3:00
3.	"Uptight (Everything's Alright)"	2:54
4.	"Dancing in the Street"	2:40
5.	"I'm on My Way to Canaan"	3:23
6.	"Can You Do It"	2:20
7.	"Shake It Up, Baby (aka Twist And Shout)"	2:30
8.	"Down in the Boondocks"	2:36
9.	"I've Been Loving You Too Long (To Stop Now)"	3:13
10.	"Ain't That Good News"	2:40
11.	"I Will Make the Darkness Light"	2:25
12.	"Glory Road"	4:19
Total length:		32:43

== Release ==
=== Home media ===
Following its release in theaters, separate widescreen and fullscreen editions of the motion picture were released on DVD in the United States on June 6, 2006. A UMD version of the film for the PlayStation Portable was also released on June 6, 2006.

A restored widescreen high definition Blu-ray version was released on October 17, 2006. Special features include backstage feature film: Audio commentary with producer Jerry Bruckheimer & director James Gartner; Audio commentary with screenwriters Chris Cleveland and Bettina Gilois; "Surviving Practice" – a featurette looking inside a typical grueling Haskins practice with former NBA star Tim Hardaway, and seamless menus.

== Reception ==
=== Critical response ===
Among mainstream critics in the U.S., the film received mixed reviews. As of June 2020, the film holds a 55% approval rating on Rotten Tomatoes, based on 152 reviews, with an average score of 5.92/10. The consensus states, "As formulaic as sports movies get, this underdog story still triumphs on the strength of its inspiring story." At Metacritic, which assigns a weighted average out of 100 to critics' reviews, Glory Road received a score of 58 based on 33 reviews. Audiences polled by CinemaScore gave the film an average grade of "A" on an A+ to F scale.

The film won the 2006 ESPY Award for Best Sports Movie. Furthermore, in 2006, Glory Road was nominated for the Humanitas Prize. In 2007, the film garnered nominations for Best Screenplay, Adapted or Original and Best Original or Adapted Song from the Black Reel Awards.

=== Box office ===
The film became a box office number-one in the U.S. grossing $16,927,589 on its opening weekend. The film grossed a total of $42,938,449 worldwide, almost entirely in the U.S.

== See also ==
- 2006 in film
- 1965–66 Texas Western Miners basketball team
- 1966 NCAA University Division Basketball Championship Game
- List of basketball films
- List of sports films
- White savior narrative in film

== Bibliography ==
- Haskins, Don with Dan Wetzel. Glory Road. New York:Hyperion, 2006. ISBN 1-4013-0791-4.
