= Don Haskins Center =

Arena in Texas, United States

- "The Don"
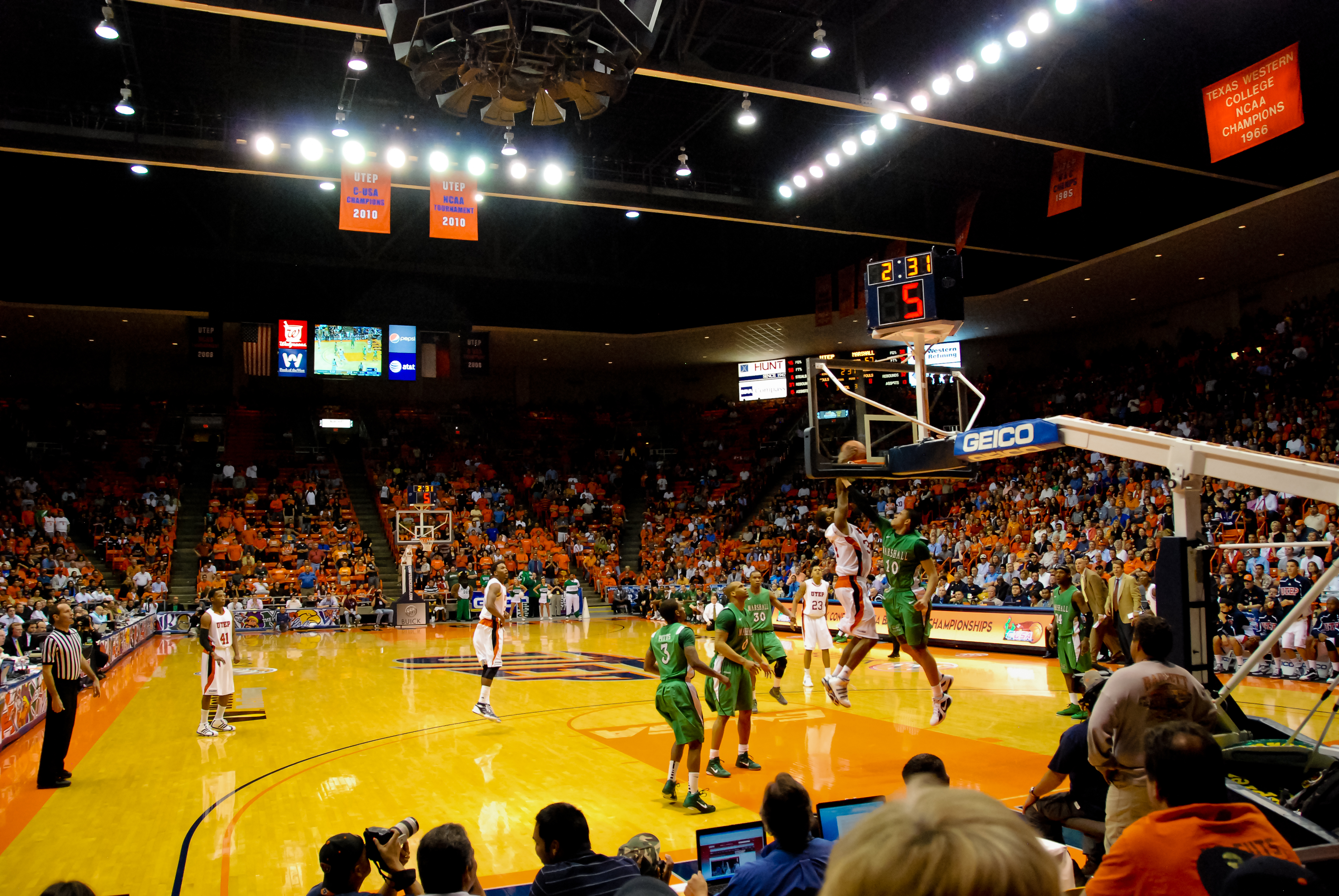
- The interior of the Don Haskins Center as it appeared on March 10, 2011
- Interactive map of Don Haskins Center
- Former names: Special Events Center (1977–1998)
- Location: 151 Glory Road; El Paso, Texas 79968
- Coordinates: 31.777608°N 106.505718°W
- Owner: University of Texas at El Paso
- Operator: University of Texas at El Paso
- Capacity: 11,892 (Basketball); 12,567 (concerts)
- Surface: Hardwood

Construction
- Groundbreaking: January 13, 1975
- Opened: February 3, 1977
- Cost: $10 million ($53.1 million in 2025 dollars)
- Architect: B. W. Crane Architects
- Structural engineer: Walter P Moore
- General contractor: Jordan Nobles Construction

Tenant
- UTEP Miners (1977–present)

The Don Haskins Center, formerly known as the Special Events Center, is the home of UTEP Miners men's and women's basketball. The venue is located in the heart of El Paso, Texas. In addition to hosting sporting events, the Don Haskins Center is also used by many area schools, such as El Paso Community College, for graduation and commencement ceremonies. Due to its large seating capacity, the center is also the city's premier entertainment venue and has hosted big-name acts such as pop star Shakira's Tour of the Mongoose, Oral Fixation Tour and The Sun Comes Out World Tour, Britney Spears during her Circus Tour, comedian George Lopez and rock band Kiss.

== History ==
Built in 1977, as the Special Events Center, the venue replaced Memorial Gym. The Special Events Center was renamed after UTEP's Hall of Fame coach Don Haskins (1930–2008) in 1998. Haskins, who is best known for starting five African-American players in the 1966 NCAA Championship game against Kentucky, was inducted into the National Collegiate Basketball Hall of Fame in 1997 and retired from the university in 1999. The arena was the site of a milestone win during the 1997–1998 season, as coach Haskins notched his 700th career victory against SMU. The arena was also the site of the 1984, 1985, and 1990 Western Athletic Conference men's basketball tournaments and the 2011 and 2014 Conference USA tournaments. It also hosted NCAA Men's Basketball tournament first- and second-round games in 1981. In September 2008 Don Haskins lay in state there for several days after dying of natural causes.

The Haskins Center features a Robbins Bio-Channel Star maple floor, installed in the summer of 2002, as well as two modern locker rooms, training facilities and basketball coaches' offices. The game-day environment for basketball was enhanced in recent years with the addition of four new scoreboards and two video replay boards to the arena. The arena now has a total of seven electronic scoreboards.

While it had originally been built as an alternative to the Pan American Center in Las Cruces, New Mexico, which at the time was the larger of the two arenas, today the Haskins Center is the dominant concert venue in the area. The Pan American Center was renovated in 2006 and has since been used as an alternative venue due to similar concert capacity. It is also the regional stop for WWE when it visits the El Paso area.

== UTEP Basketball ==
The Miner men's basketball team has posted a 476–140 (.773) record in 34 years at the arena. UTEP won 25 straight home games from January 23, 1987 to December 16, 1989. The Miners have posted undefeated home records in three seasons: 1983–1984 (21–0), 1985–1986 (19–0) and 1988–1989 (18–0). They also won the first 10 conference games they played there after joining Conference USA in 2005. UTEP has defeated many top-10 ranked teams in the Don Haskins Center over the years, including #10 Arizona (1977), #5 Georgetown (1985), #5 Wyoming (1988) and #9 Utah (1993), among others.

UTEP has attracted 5,592,257 fans in 34 seasons at the arena. The 11,892-seat arena (formerly 12,222 due to the late El Paso Sports legend Paul Strelzin) has been sold out for UTEP basketball games 112 times.

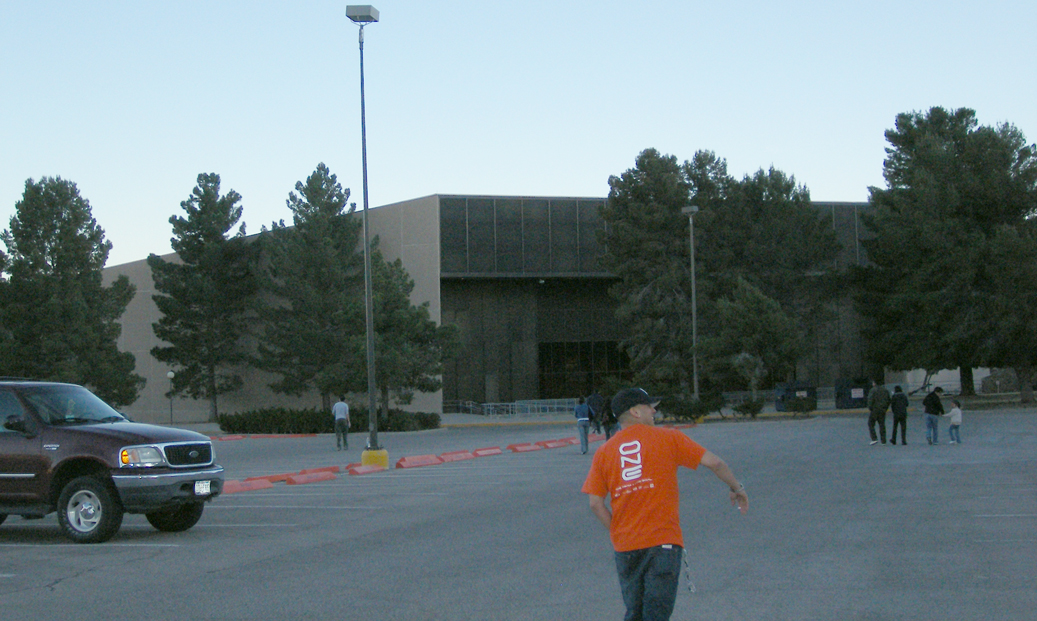
Fans enter the Don Haskins Center early before a UTEP Men's basketball game.

== Concerts ==
The Don Haskins Center has hosted artists such as Shakira, Metallica, Fall Out Boy, Iron Maiden, Cher, AC/DC, Luis Miguel, Shawn Mendes, Nine Inch Nails, The Cure, Jelly Roll, and Kali Uchis.

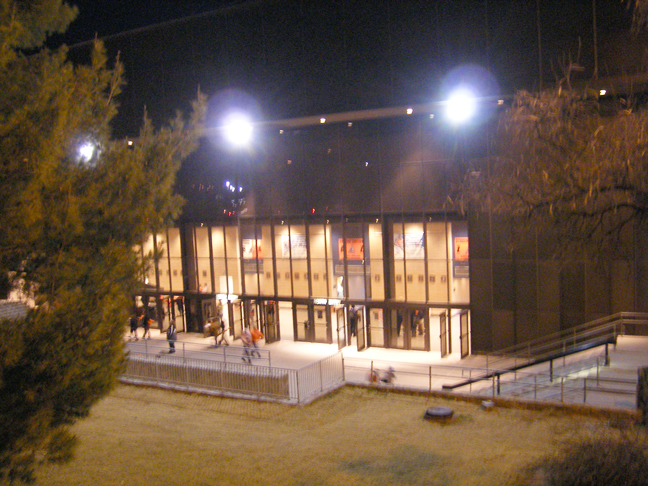
Don Haskins Center north entrance

== See also ==
- List of indoor arenas in the United States
- List of NCAA Division I basketball arenas
