= Nevil Shed =

American basketball player and coach

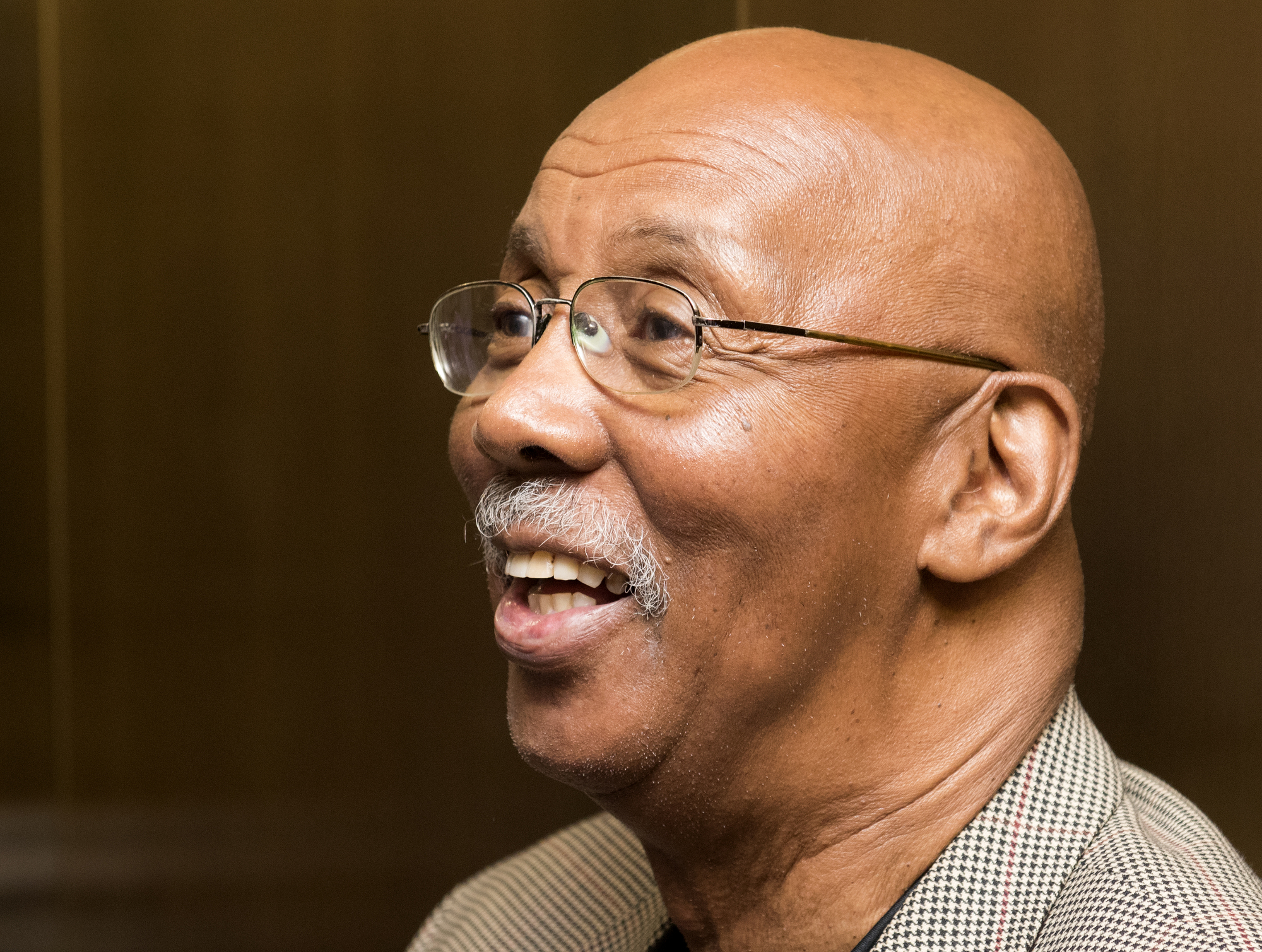
- Shed in 2018

Personal information
- Born: April 26, 1943 (age 83) Bronx, New York, U.S.
- Listed height: 6 ft 8 in (2.03 m)

Career information
- High school: Morris (Bronx, New York)
- College: UTEP (1964–1967)
- NBA draft: 1967: 4th round, 40th overall pick
- Drafted by: Boston Celtics
- Position: Power forward

Career highlights
- NCAA champion (1966)
- Stats at Basketball Reference

Nevil Shed (born April 26, 1943) is an American former basketball player. He attended Morris High school in 1962. He was a member of the Texas Western Miners (now named University of Texas at El Paso) team that won the 1966 NCAA Men's Division I Basketball Tournament national championship. The team was coached by Don Haskins. The Miners made history for being the first team to start an all-African American lineup in the championship game. His basketball nickname was "The Shadow". Glory Road, a 2006 Disney film, chronicles the team's journey; Shed is played by Al Shearer. After playing at Texas Western, Shed was drafted by the Boston Celtics in the fourth round of the 1967 NBA draft alongside the Denver Rockets in the second round of the 1967 American Basketball Association draft (his name was listed as Neville Shed in both drafts). His career ended when he tore up his leg while attempting a lay-up at a game in training camp. Because of that, he never played in the NBA or in other leagues. He later became an assistant coach for Haskins at Texas Western. He now works as the director of summer training camp for the San Antonio Spurs.

== Personal life ==
Shed has lived in the San Antonio, Texas, area for the last 25 years and served as a Coordinator for Student Activities at the University of Texas at San Antonio University Center. When he is off from his job at UTSA, he is a San Antonio Spurs associate and a motivational speaker. Shed is also a coach at the San Antonio Spurs Basketball Camp. He does substitute teaching as a side job at Metzger Middle School in San Antonio/Converse Tx. area. For the last two years, Nevil Shed has worked at Judson High School as a greeter and an ISS teacher.
