= Dave Lattin =

American basketball player

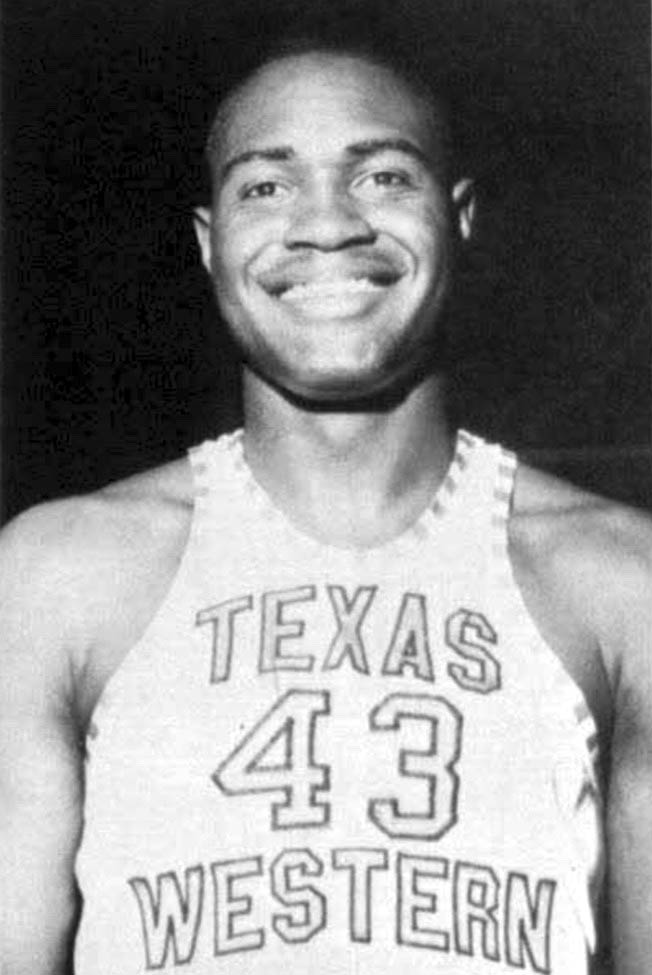
- Lattin at UTEP (formerly Texas Western) in 1966

Personal information
- Born: December 23, 1943 (age 82) Houston, Texas, U.S.
- Listed height: 6 ft 6 in (1.98 m)
- Listed weight: 225 lb (102 kg)

Career information
- High school: Worthing (Houston, Texas)
- College: UTEP (1965–1967)
- NBA draft: 1967: 1st round, 10th overall pick
- Drafted by: San Francisco Warriors
- Playing career: 1967–1973
- Position: Power forward / center
- Number: 47, 43, 33, 22

Career history
- 1967–1968: San Francisco Warriors
- 1968–1969: Phoenix Suns
- 1970–1972: Pittsburgh Condors
- 1972–1973: Memphis Tams

Career highlights
- NCAA champion (1966); Third-team All-American – AP, NABC (1967); No. 43 retired by UTEP Miners

Career NBA and ABA statistics
- Points: 1,904 (7.2 ppg)
- Rebounds: 1,332 (5.1 rpg)
- Assists: 184 (0.7 apg)
- Stats at NBA.com
- Stats at Basketball Reference

David Lattin (born December 23, 1943) is an American former basketball player. He was the starting center for the Texas Western Miners in their NCAA championship year in 1966. During his playing career, he was listed at 6 feet 6 inches tall and 225 lbs. His nickname during his career was "Big Daddy D".

== Early life and college career ==
David Lattin was born on December 23, 1943, in Houston Texas. His mother, Elsie Lattin, was widowed when Lattin's father died in 1949. Lattin attended elementary and secondary schools in Houston before graduating from Evan E. Worthing Senior High School in 1963. Lattin was named All-State and All-American in basketball both his junior and senior years and was the first Texas player to be named to a High School All-American team.

Lattin left Tennessee State in 1964 citing the lack of basketball competition. He returned to Houston and played the AAAU before receiving a full scholarship to attend Texas Western College in 1965 where he played with the Miners, a Division 1 team in the NCAA. Under the leadership of Coach Don Haskins, the Miners won the 1966 Division 1 NCAA National Championship with five black starting players. Lattin was named All-American during the 1966 and 1967 seasons.

== Pro career ==
In 1967, Lattin left Texas Western College after he was drafted as the number ten pick by the NBA's San Francisco Warriors. The Kansas City Chiefs, of the American Football League, used their final pick in the 1967 draft (443rd overall) on Lattin as a prospective wide receiver. He went on to play with the Phoenix Suns, the Pittsburgh Condors, and the Memphis Tams, ending his professional career with the Harlem Globetrotters from 1973 to 1976.

== After basketball ==
Returning to school, Lattin earned his B.S. degree in business administration and started several successful business ventures including Your Maison Housing. Lattin was inducted into the Texas Black Sports Hall of Fame and the Naismith Memorial Basketball Hall of Fame in 2007 as part of the 1966 Texas Western team. That year, he also wrote Slam Dunk to Glory.

He was portrayed by Schin A.S. Kerr in the 2006 Disney film Glory Road produced by Jerry Bruckheimer.

== Personal life ==
Lattin has a son Clifton, a daughter Leslie, and several grandchildren. His grandson, Khadeem attended the University of Oklahoma. He had started every game of the 2016–2017 basketball season for the Sooners. Another grandson, Mathias Lattin is an accomplished blues musician and his band is the winner of the 2023 International Blues Challenge.

== Career statistics ==
Legend
GP	Games played	GS	Games started	MPG	Minutes per game
FG%	Field goal percentage	3P%	3-point field goal percentage	FT%	Free throw percentage
RPG	Rebounds per game	APG	Assists per game	SPG	Steals per game
BPG	Blocks per game	PPG	Points per game	**Bold**	Career high

=== NBA/ABA ===
==== Regular season ====
Year	Team	GP	MPG	FG%	3P%	FT%	RPG	APG	PPG
1967–68	San Francisco	44	5.8	.363		.697	2.4	.3	2.2
1968–69	Phoenix	68	14.5	.410		.634	4.8	.7	6.0
1970–71	Pittsburgh (ABA)	**71**	16.0	.469	.000	.610	**6.6**	**.9**	6.5
1971–72	Pittsburgh (ABA)	64	**23.2**	**.544**	.000	.612	5.9	.8	**12.6**
1972–73	Memphis (ABA)	16	18.5	.462	.000	**.756**	3.9	.4	8.1
Career (NBA)		112	11.1	.400		.644	3.8	.6	4.5
Career (ABA)		151	19.3	.510	.000	.625	6.0	.8	9.3
Career (overall)		263	15.8	.477	.000	.631	5.1	.7	7.2

==== Playoffs ====
Year	Team	GP	MPG	FG%	FT%	RPG	APG	PPG
1968	San Francisco	5	5.4	.200	.833	1.0	.2	1.4

=== College ===
Year	Team	GP	FG%	FT%	RPG	PPG
1965–66	UTEP	**29**	**.495**	**.703**	8.6	14.0
1966–67	UTEP	27	.474	.699	**10.1**	**15.1**
Career		56	.484	.701	9.3	14.6
