= Harry Flournoy =

American basketball player (1943–2016)

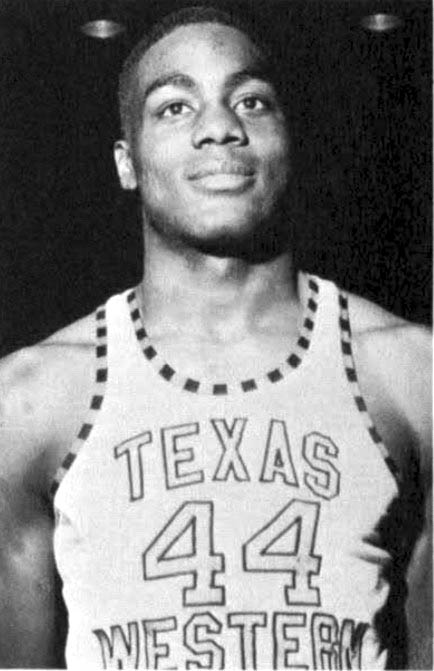
- Flournoy at UTEP in 1966

Personal information
- Born: December 10, 1943 Fall River, Massachusetts, U.S.
- Died: November 26, 2016 (aged 72) McDonough, Georgia, U.S.
- Listed height: 6 ft 5 in (1.96 m)

Career information
- High school: Emerson (Gary, Indiana)
- College: UTEP (1963–1966)
- NBA draft: 1966: undrafted
- Position: Forward

Career highlights
- NCAA champion (1966)

Harry Flournoy Jr. (December 10, 1943 – November 26, 2016) was an American college basketball player, originally from Gary, Indiana.

== Family life ==
Flournoy was born on December 10, 1943, in Fall River, Massachusetts. Early in his childhood his family moved to Gary, Indiana, where he graduated from Emerson High School (Indiana) in 1962. He grew up with twin brothers, Robert and Raymond and sister Deatra.

After his career at Texas Western, Flournoy became a teacher and basketball coach in El Paso, Texas. In 1972 his family moved to California where he became a sales representative. Flournoy has six children: one daughter from his first marriage, and three daughters and two sons from his second marriage; and no children from his 3rd (last) marriage. He resided in McDonough, Georgia, a suburb of Atlanta.

Flournoy died on November 26, 2016, in McDonough, Georgia.

== Sports ==
He was a three-year starter and Co-Captain for Texas Western College, renamed The University of Texas at El Paso or UTEP the year following the 1966 Championship win.

Flournoy made history when his team won the 1966 NCAA Division I National Championship game against the University of Kentucky with the first ever all Black starting lineup. The team was coached by Hall of Fame coach Don Haskins. He injured his knee during the first quarter of the game, however following the victory he appeared on the cover of Sports Illustrated rebounding over Pat Riley. Texas Western Miners was the first college team inducted into the Naismith Basketball Hall of Fame in 2007.

In the 2006 film Glory Road, about the 1966 championship team, Flournoy was portrayed by Mehcad Brooks.

Harry remains one of only two UTEP players to record 300+ rebounds in two consecutive seasons. All-American Jim "Bad News" Barnes is the other. In three years as a starter his teams won 70 games and lost only 13 games.
