= 1966 NCAA University Division basketball tournament =

Edition of USA college basketball tournament

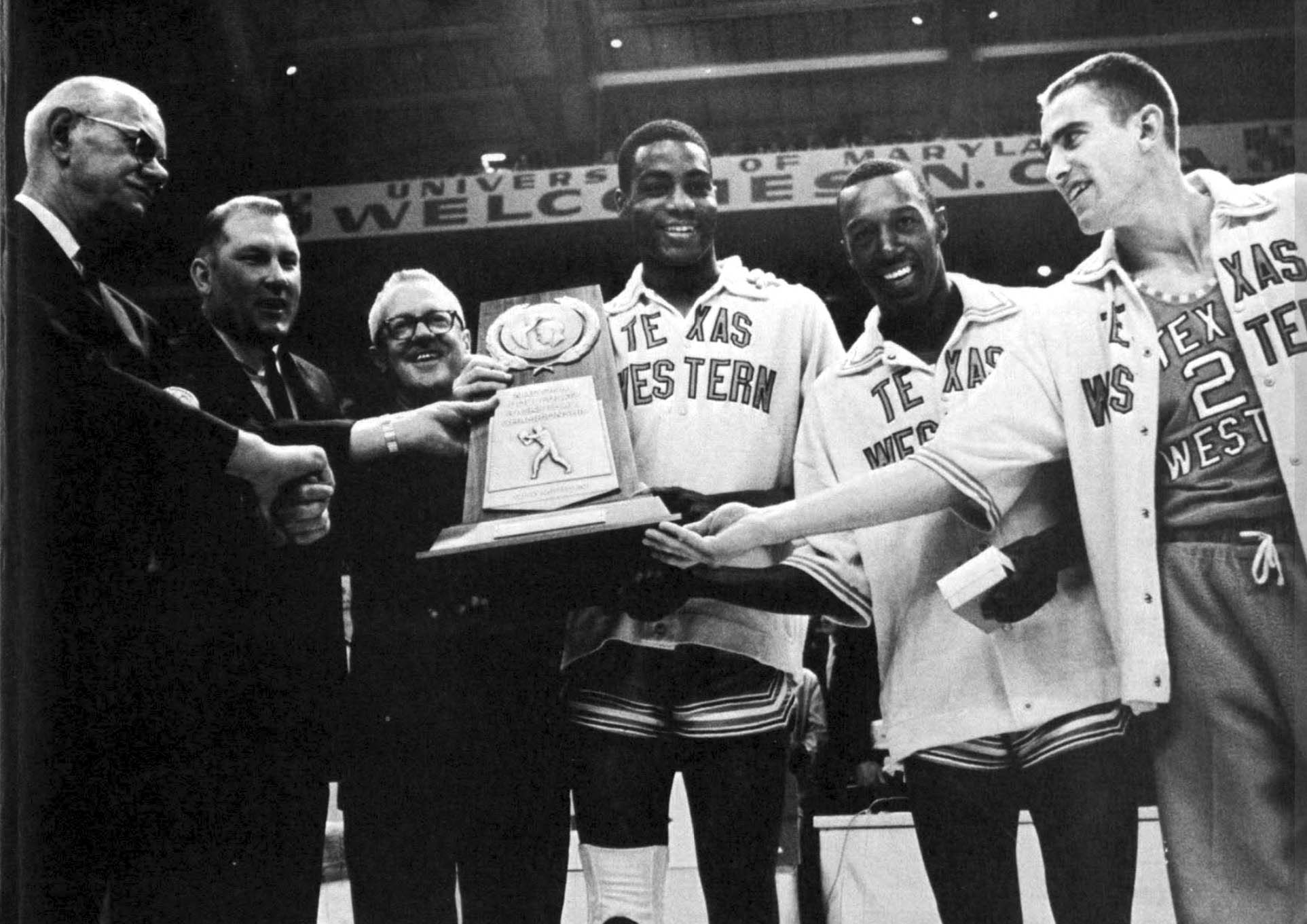
- Texas Western, national champions
- Season: 1965–66
- Teams: 22
- Finals site: Cole Field House, College Park, Maryland
- Champions: Texas Western Miners (1st title, 1st title game, 1st Final Four)
- Runner-up: Kentucky Wildcats (5th title game, 6th Final Four)
- Semifinalists: Duke Blue Devils (3rd Final Four); Utah Redskins (3rd Final Four)
- Winning coach: Don Haskins (1st title)
- MOP: Jerry Chambers (Utah)
- Attendance: 140,925
- Top scorer: Jerry Chambers (Utah) (143 points)

The 1966 NCAA University Division basketball tournament involved 22 schools playing in single-elimination play to determine the national men's basketball champion of the NCAA University Division, now Division I. The 28th annual edition of the tournament began on March 7, and ended with the championship game on March 19, at Cole Field House, located on the campus of the University of Maryland in College Park. A total of 26 games were played, including a third place game in each region and a national third place game.

Third-ranked Texas Western (now UTEP), coached by Don Haskins, won the national title with a 72–65 victory in the final over top-ranked Kentucky, led by head coach Adolph Rupp. Haskins started five black players for the first time in NCAA Championship history. Jerry Chambers of Utah was named the tournament's Most Outstanding Player.

The 2006 film Glory Road is based on the story of the 1966 Texas Western team. Their tournament games against fourth-ranked Kansas and Kentucky are depicted in the film.

The tournament is also significant in that it was the last tournament until 2021, and one of two since the league's official founding, that the Ivy League did not send a representative to the tournament. The league champion, Penn, refused to comply with an NCAA edict that all teams must certify a 1.6 GPA for all student-athletes; the Ivy League and the university did not believe that the NCAA had the power to dictate such things, and as such the team was banned. They would have played Syracuse in the East regional at Blacksburg.

This was the only NCAA tournament between 1961 and 1982 which did not include UCLA.

== Locations ==
Round	Region	Site	Venue	Host
First Round	East	Blacksburg, Virginia	Cassell Coliseum	Virginia Tech
First Round	Mideast	Kent, Ohio	Memorial Gymnasium	Kent State
First Round	Midwest & West	Wichita, Kansas	WSU Field House	Wichita State
Regionals	East	Raleigh, North Carolina	Reynolds Coliseum	N.C. State
Regionals	Mideast	Iowa City, Iowa	Iowa Field House	Iowa
Regionals	Midwest	Lubbock, Texas	Lubbock Municipal Coliseum	Texas Tech
Regionals	West	Los Angeles, California	Pauley Pavilion	UCLA
Final Four		College Park, Maryland	Cole Field House	Maryland

== Teams ==
Region	Team	Coach	Conference	Finished	Final Opponent	Score
East
East	Davidson	Lefty Driesell	Southern	Regional Fourth Place	Saint Joseph's	L 92–76
East	Duke	Vic Bubas	Atlantic Coast	Third Place	Utah	W 79–77
East	Providence	Joe Mullaney	Independent	First round	Saint Joseph's	L 65–48
East	Rhode Island	Ernie Calverley	Yankee	First round	Davidson	L 95–65
East	Saint Joseph's	Jack Ramsay	Middle Atlantic	Regional third place	Davidson	W 92–76
East	Syracuse	Fred Lewis	Independent	Regional Runner-up	Duke	L 91–81
Mideast
Mideast	Dayton	Don Donoher	Independent	Regional Fourth Place	Western Kentucky	L 82–62
Mideast	Kentucky	Adolph Rupp	Southeastern	Runner Up	Texas Western	L 72–65
Mideast	Loyola–Chicago	George Ireland	Independent	First round	Western Kentucky	L 105–86
Mideast	Miami (OH)	Dick Shrider	Mid-American	First round	Dayton	L 58–51
Mideast	Michigan	Dave Strack	Big Ten	Regional Runner-up	Kentucky	L 84–77
Mideast	Western Kentucky	Johnny Oldham	Ohio Valley	Regional third place	Dayton	W 82–62
Midwest
Midwest	Cincinnati	Tay Baker	Missouri Valley	Regional Fourth Place	SMU	L 89–84
Midwest	Kansas	Ted Owens	Big Eight	Regional Runner-up	Texas Western	L 81–80
Midwest	Oklahoma City	Abe Lemons	Independent	First round	Texas Western	L 89–74
Midwest	SMU	Doc Hayes	Southwest	Regional third place	Cincinnati	W 89–84
Midwest	Texas Western	Don Haskins	Independent	Champion	Kentucky	W 72–65
West
West	Colorado State	Jim Williams	Independent	First round	Houston	L 82–76
West	Houston	Guy Lewis	Independent	Regional third place	Pacific	W 102–91
West	Oregon State	Paul Valenti	AAWU	Regional Runner-up	Utah	L 70–64
West	Pacific	Dick Edwards	West Coast Athletic	Regional Fourth Place	Houston	L 102–91
West	Utah	Jack Gardner	Western Athletic	Fourth Place	Duke	L 79–77

== Bracket ==
=== East region ===
Quarterfinals
Saint Joseph's	65
Providence	48
Davidson	96
Rhode Island	65

Semifinals
Duke	76
Saint Joseph's	74
Syracuse	94
Davidson	78

Finals
Duke	91
Syracuse	81

=== Mideast region ===
Quarterfinals
Dayton	58
Miami (OH)	51
Western Kentucky	105
Loyola–Chicago	86

Semifinals
Kentucky	86
Dayton	79
Michigan	80
Western Kentucky	79

Finals
Kentucky	84
Michigan	77

=== Midwest region ===
Quarterfinals
Texas Western	89
Oklahoma City	74

Semifinals
Kansas	76
SMU	70
Cincinnati	76*
Texas Western	78

Finals
Kansas	80**
Texas Western	81

=== West region ===
Quarterfinals
Houston	82
Colorado State	76

Semifinals
Utah	83
Pacific	74
Oregon State	63
Houston	60

Finals
Utah	70
Oregon State	64

=== Final Four ===
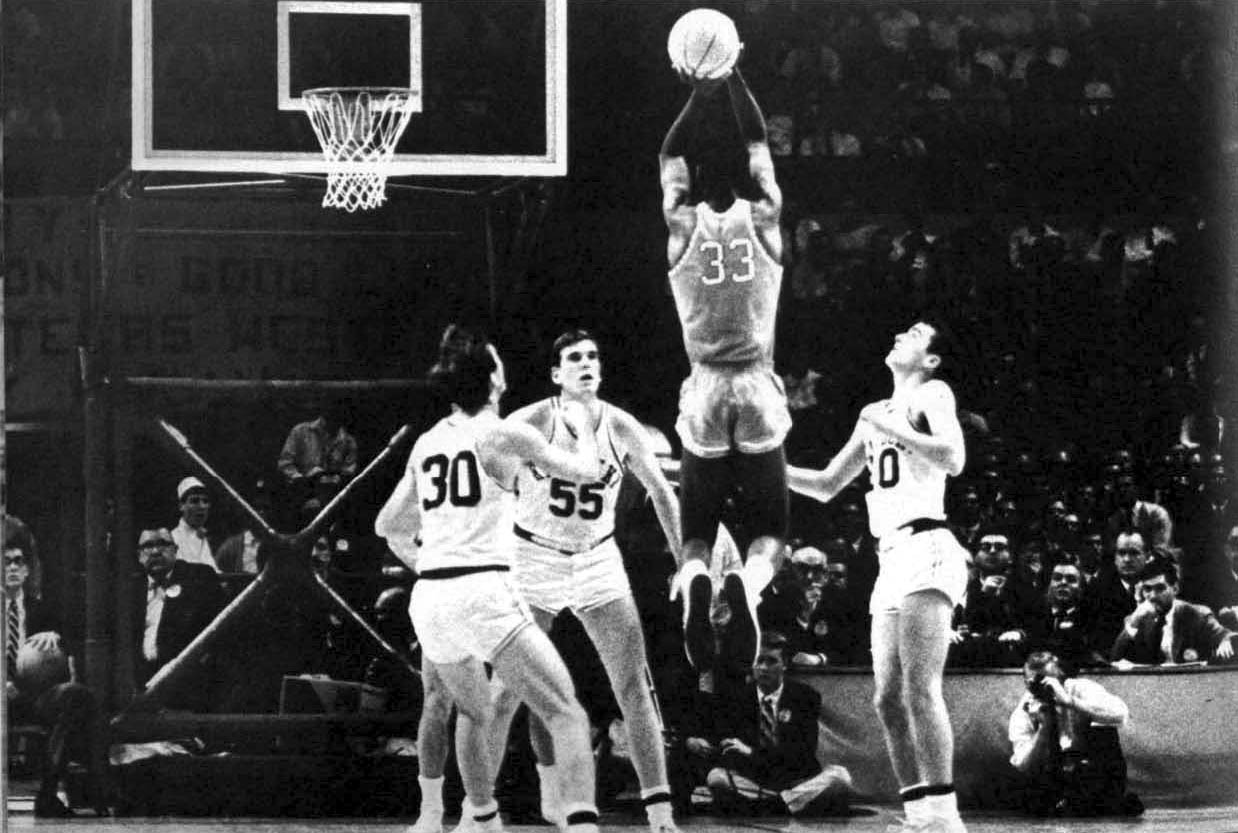
A moment of the final, with Nevil Shed (33) shooting

National Semifinals
E	Duke	79
ME	Kentucky	83
MW	Texas Western	85
W	Utah	78

National Championship Game
ME	Kentucky	65
MW	Texas Western	72

=== National Third Place Game ===
National Third Place Game
E	Duke	79
W	Utah	77

=== Regional third place games ===
East Regional third place
Saint Joseph's	92
Davidson	76

Mideast Regional third place
Western Kentucky	82
Dayton	62

Midwest Regional third place
SMU	89
Cincinnati	84

West Regional third place
Houston	102
Pacific	91

== Game summaries ==
The Tournament is most remembered for the all-black starting five of Texas Western defeating an all-white starting five for Kentucky in the championship game.

Clem Haskins and Dwight Smith became the first black athletes to integrate the Western Kentucky Hilltoppers basketball program in the Fall of 1963. This put Western Kentucky at the forefront to integrate college basketball in the Southeast. The Western Kentucky Hilltoppers were 2 points away from defeating Michigan and meeting the University of Kentucky Wildcats in the Mideast regional final. A controversial foul called against Smith during a jump ball put Cazzie Russell on the free throw line for Michigan, where he scored the tying and winning points.

== See also ==
- 1966 NCAA College Division basketball tournament
- 1966 National Invitation Tournament
- 1966 NAIA basketball tournament
- 1966 NCAA University Division basketball championship game
- Black participation in college basketball
