= Don Haskins =

American basketball player and coach (1930–2008)

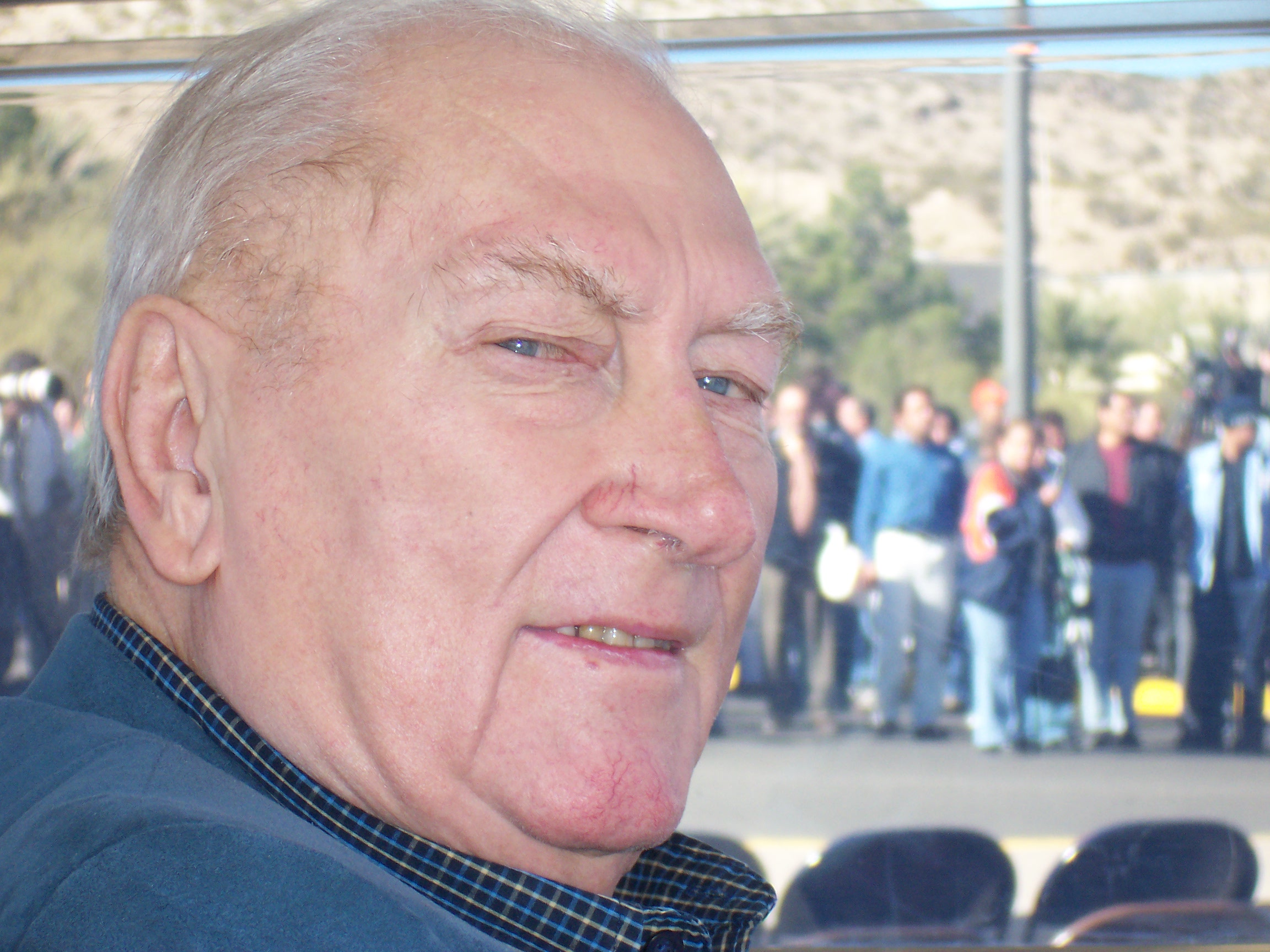
- Haskins in 2005

Biographical details
- Born: March 14, 1930; Enid, Oklahoma, U.S.
- Died: September 7, 2008 (aged 78); El Paso, Texas, U.S.

Playing career
- 1949–1952: Oklahoma A&M

Coaching career (HC unless noted)
- 1955–1956: Benjamin HS (TX)
- 1956–1960: Hedley HS (TX)
- 1960–1961: Dumas HS (TX)
- 1961–1999: Texas Western / UTEP
- 1972: United States (assistant)

Head coaching record
- Overall: 719–353
- Tournaments: 14–13 (NCAA); 4–6 (NIT)

Accomplishments and honors

Championships
- NCAA University Division tournament (1966); 7 WAC regular season (1970, 1983–1987, 1992); 4 WAC tournament (1984, 1986, 1989, 1990)

Awards
- 2× WAC Coach of the Year (1983, 1987)
- Basketball Hall of Fame; Inducted in 1997
- College Basketball Hall of Fame; Inducted in 2006

Donald Lee Haskins (March 14, 1930 – September 7, 2008), nicknamed "the Bear", was an American basketball player and coach. He played college basketball for three years under coach Henry Iba at Oklahoma A&M (now Oklahoma State University). He was the head coach at the University of Texas at El Paso from 1961 to 1999 (the school was known as Texas Western College until 1967). In 1966 his team won the NCAA tournament over the Wildcats of the University of Kentucky, coached by Adolph Rupp. The watershed game highlighted the end of racial segregation in college basketball.

In his time at Texas Western/UTEP, he compiled a 719–353 record, suffering only five losing seasons. His Miners won seven Western Athletic Conference championships and four WAC tournament titles, had fourteen NCAA tournament berths and made seven trips to the NIT. Haskins led UTEP to 17 20-plus-win seasons and served as an assistant Olympic team coach in 1972. He was admitted to the Naismith Memorial Basketball Hall of Fame in 1997 as a basketball coach. His 1966 team was inducted in its entirety by the same Hall of Fame on September 7, 2007. A movie was made about him called Glory Road in 2006.

== Early coaching career ==
After college and a stint with the Amateur Athletic Union's Artesia Travelers, Haskins began coaching small-town Texas high schools (Benjamin, Hedley and Dumas) from 1955 to 1961. He took a pay cut for a chance to be a college coach, accepting a job offer at Texas Western College—now known as the University of Texas at El Paso (UTEP) in 1961.

In the 1950s, prior to Haskins' arrival, Texas Western recruited and played African American players in a time when it was still common to find all-white college sports teams, particularly in the South. When Haskins arrived in El Paso, he inherited three black players from his coaching predecessor. One of those players, El Paso native Nolan Richardson, later won the 1994 NCAA Division I men's basketball tournament national championship as the head coach at Arkansas.

In 1961–62, Haskins' first season as head coach, the Miners had an 18–6 record. The next year they posted a 19–7 mark and made the first of 14 NCAA tournament appearances under Haskins. They again reached the NCAA Tournament in 1964 and played in the NIT in 1965. On numerous occasions, Haskins stated that he believed his 1964 team could have won the NCAA Tournament had All-American Jim Barnes not fouled out after playing only eight minutes in a 64–60 loss to Kansas State in the tournament.

== 1966 NCAA Championship team ==
The Texas Western Miners finished the 1965–66 regular season with a 23–1 record, entering the NCAA Tournament ranked third in the nation in the final regular season AP college basketball poll.

In the first round of the tournament, the Miners defeated Oklahoma City 89–74. In the next round, they defeated Cincinnati 78–76 in overtime. They went on to defeat Kansas in double overtime in the Midwest Regional Finals, 81–80, and to defeat Utah in the national semifinals, 85–78.

Facing the top-ranked University of Kentucky in the championship game, Haskins made history by starting five African American players for the first time in a championship game against Kentucky's all-white squad, coached by Adolph Rupp. The Miners took the lead midway in the first half and never relinquished it — though Kentucky closed to within a point early in the second half. The Miners finished with 72 points to Kentucky's 65, winning the tournament and finishing the year with a 28–1 record.

Later asked about his decision to start five African American players, Haskins downplayed the significance of his decision. "I really didn't think about starting five black guys. I just wanted to put my five best guys on the court," Haskins was later quoted as saying. "I just wanted to win that game."

Though credited with advancing the desegregation of college basketball teams in the South, he wrote in his book, Glory Road, "I certainly did not expect to be some racial pioneer or to change the world."

== Post-championship career ==
Haskins was never able to duplicate his 1966 success. After winning the 1966 title, his Miners would only win seven more NCAA Tournament games and only survived the tournament's first weekend twice, in 1967 and 1992. In 1969, he accepted the head coaching job at the University of Detroit, but resigned after three days to return to UTEP.

Nonetheless, he is regarded as an important figure in basketball history. Among the players he coached at UTEP over the years were future NBA all-stars Nate Archibald, Tim Hardaway, and Antonio Davis. Other UTEP alumni moving to the NBA included Marlon Maxey and Greg Foster. He was also a mentor for several future coaches, including Nolan Richardson and Tim Floyd. He served as an assistant coach under Hank Iba in the 1972 Summer Olympics in Munich.

A street is named after him in El Paso's East side. In 1977, UTEP moved from Memorial Gym, home of the 1966 champions, to the larger Special Events Center. In 1998, before what would be Haskins' last season, it was renamed the Don Haskins Center in his honor, making Haskins one of the few coaches to have coached at a venue named for him.

Bob Knight was Haskins' fishing partner and one of his best friends. Another good friend, Norm Ellenberger, was former coach of the New Mexico Lobos.

In 1997, he was inducted into the Oklahoma Sports hall of Fame.

== Glory Road ==
Glory Road, a Walt Disney Pictures film about the then-Texas Western 1966 championship season, was released on January 13, 2006. Haskins is portrayed in the film by actor Josh Lucas. On November 29, 2005, the City of El Paso renamed the street between its two basketball arenas "Glory Road." Adolph Rupp Jr. pointed out that his father had previously used the term "Glory Road" in his farewell speech to his fans and worried that his father would be villainized in the film. However, director Jim Gartner stated that Rupp Sr. would not be negatively portrayed in the film, claiming that Jon Voight, who played Rupp, was careful in his role, seeking not to characterize Rupp as a racist.

Haskins stated his disappointment at the cutting of the movie scenes of his one-on-one games with his boyhood friend Herman Carr, who is African-American. Carr was present in El Paso as a guest for the premiere screening, November 28, 2005. These scenes would have depicted a formative influence on Haskins' game of basketball. Haskins appeared in the movie as an extra by playing a gas station attendant.

Glory Road was produced by Jerry Bruckheimer, and was based upon Haskins' official same-titled autobiography, written with Dan Wetzel and released by Hyperion Books in 2005. A national best seller, it was reprinted five times in its first four months of release and was selected as an "Editor's Choice" by the New York Times Book Review.

== Death ==
Haskins died at his home on September 7, 2008. He was survived by his wife Mary, sons Brent, Steve, and David, and grandsons John Paul, Cameron, and Dominick. A fourth son, Mark, died in 1994. His son Steve is a professional golfer who began play on the Champions Tour after reaching the age of 50 and won two events on the Nationwide Tour during his regular career years. Haskins is buried at the Memory Gardens of the Valley in Santa Teresa, New Mexico.

== Head coaching record ==
Record table
Season	Team	Overall	Conference	Standing	Postseason
Texas Western Miners (Border Conference) (1961–1962)
1961–62	Texas Western	18–6	5–3	2nd	
Texas Western / UTEP Miners (NCAA University Division independent) (1962–1969)
1962–63	Texas Western	19–7			NCAA University Division First Round
1963–64	Texas Western	25–3			NCAA University Division Second Round
1964–65	Texas Western	16–9			NIT First Round
1965–66	Texas Western	28–1			NCAA University Division Champion
1966–67	Texas Western	22–6			NCAA University Division Second Round
1967–68	UTEP	14–9			
1968–69	UTEP	16–9			
UTEP Miners (Western Athletic Conference) (1969–1999)
1969–70	UTEP	17–8	10–4	1st	NCAA University Division First Round
1970–71	UTEP	15–10	9–5	T–2nd	
1971–72	UTEP	20–7	9–5	T–2nd	NIT First Round
1972–73	UTEP	16–10	6–8	5th	
1973–74	UTEP	18–7	8–6	5th	
1974–75	UTEP	20–6	10–4	2nd	NCAA Division I First Round
1975–76	UTEP	19–7	9–5	T–2nd	
1976–77	UTEP	11–15	3–11	8th	
1977–78	UTEP	10–16	2–12	8th	
1978–79	UTEP	11–15	3–9	T–5th	
1979–80	UTEP	20–8	10–4	T–2nd	NIT Second Round
1980–81	UTEP	18–12	9–7	4th	NIT Second Round
1981–82	UTEP	20–8	11–5	T–2nd	
1982–83	UTEP	19–10	11–5	T–1st	NIT First Round
1983–84	UTEP	27–4	13–3	1st	NCAA Division I Second Round
1984–85	UTEP	22–10	12–4	1st	NCAA Division I Second Round
1985–86	UTEP	27–6	12–4	T–1st	NCAA Division I First Round
1986–87	UTEP	25–7	13–3	1st	NCAA Division I Second Round
1987–88	UTEP	23–10	10–6	4th	NCAA Division I First Round
1988–89	UTEP	26–7	11–5	T–2nd	NCAA Division I Second Round
1989–90	UTEP	21–11	10–6	T–3rd	NCAA Division I First Round
1990–91	UTEP	16–13	7–9	T–5th	
1991–92	UTEP	27–7	12–4	T–1st	NCAA Division I Sweet 16
1992–93	UTEP	21–13	10–8	4th	NIT Second Round
1993–94	UTEP	18–12	8–10	T–5th	
1994–95	UTEP	20–10	13–5	T–2nd	NIT Second Round
1995–96	UTEP	13–15	4–14	9th	
1996–97	UTEP	13–13	6–10	T–6th (Mountain)	
1997–98	UTEP	12–14	3–11	7th (Mountain)	
1998–99	UTEP	16–12	8–6	4th (Pacific)	
UTEP:		719–353	567–201		
Total:		719–353			
National champion Postseason invitational champion Conference regular season champion Conference regular season and conference tournament champion Division regular season champion Division regular season and conference tournament champion Conference tournament champion

== See also ==
- List of college men's basketball coaches with 600 wins
- List of NCAA Division I Men's Final Four appearances by coach
- List of teachers portrayed in films

== Bibliography ==
- Fitzpatrick, Frank. And the Walls Came Tumbling Down: The Basketball Game That Changed American Sports (2000)
- Haskins, Don with Dan Wetzel. Glory Road: My Story of the 1966 NCAA Basketball Championship and How One Team Triumphed Against the Odds and Changed America Forever. New York:Hyperion, 2006. 254 pp. No index. ISBN 1-4013-0791-4.
- Sanchez, Ramon. Basketball's Biggest Upset: Texas Western Changed The Sport With A Win Over Kentucky In 1966 (1991) excerpt
