= 1965–66 NCAA University Division men's basketball season =

Men's collegiate basketball season

- Preseason AP No. 1: UCLA Bruins
- NCAA Tournament: 1966
- Tournament dates: March 7–19, 1966 –
- National Championship: Cole Field House; College Park, Maryland
- NCAA Champions: Texas Western Miners
- Helms National Champions: Texas Western Miners
- Other champions: BYU Cougars (NIT)
- Player of the Year (Helms): Cazzie Russell, Michigan Wolverines

The 1965–66 NCAA University Division men's basketball season began in December 1965, progressed through the regular season and conference tournaments, and concluded with the 1966 NCAA University Division basketball tournament championship game on March 19, 1966, at Cole Field House in College Park, Maryland. The Texas Western Miners won their first NCAA national championship with a 72–65 victory over the Kentucky Wildcats.

== Season headlines ==
- After introducing a preseason Top 20 the previous season, the Associated Press (AP) Poll contracted its preseason poll to a Top 10, aligning with the Top 10 format for in-season polls it had used since the 1961–62 season.
- The NCAA tournament contracted from 23 to 22 teams.
- On March 19, 1966, Texas Western became both the first team to begin an NCAA tournament final game with an all-African American starting lineup and the first team with an all-African American starting line-up to win the NCAA championship. The players were Orsten Artis, Harry Flournoy, Bobby Joe Hill, David Lattin, and Willie Worsley.
- The Metropolitan Collegiate Conference, consisting of schools in the New York City-New Jersey area, began play.

== Season outlook ==
=== Pre-season polls ===
The Top 10 from the AP Poll and Top 20 from the Coaches Poll during the pre-season.

Associated Press
| Ranking | Team |
|---|---|
| 1 | UCLA |
| 2 | Michigan |
| 3 | Duke |
| 4 | Saint Joseph's |
| 5 | Vanderbilt |
| 6 | Providence |
| 7 | Minnesota |
| 8 | Kansas |
| 9 | Bradley |
| 10 | Kansas State |

UPI Coaches
| Ranking | Team |
|---|---|
| 1 | UCLA |
| 2 | Michigan |
| 3 | Minnesota |
| 4 | Saint Joseph's |
| 5 | Duke |
| 6 | Vanderbilt |
| 7 | Providence |
| 8 | Kansas |
| 9 | Bradley |
| 10 | BYU |
| 11 | San Francisco |
| 12 | Kansas State |
| 13 | NC State |
| 14 | Dayton |
| 15 (tie) | Boston College |
| 15 (tie) | St. John's |
| 17 (tie) | Louisville |
| 17 (tie) | Tennessee |
| 17 (tie) | West Virginia |
| 20 (tie) | Iowa |
| 20 (tie) | New Mexico |
| 20 (tie) | Princeton |

== Conference membership changes ==
| School | Former conference | New conference |
|---|---|---|
| Fairleigh Dickinson Knights | non-NCAA University Division | Metropolitan Collegiate Conference |
| Hofstra Flying Dutchmen | non-NCAA University Division | Metropolitan Collegiate Conference |
| Iona Gaels | University Division independent | Metropolitan Collegiate Conference |
| Long Island Blackbirds | non-NCAA University Division | Metropolitan Collegiate Conference |
| Manhattan Jaspers | University Division independent | Metropolitan Collegiate Conference |
| NYU Violets | University Division independent | Metropolitan Collegiate Conference |
| Saint Peter's Peacocks | non-NCAA University Division | Metropolitan Collegiate Conference |
| St. Francis Terriers | University Division independent | Metropolitan Collegiate Conference |
| Seton Hall Pirates | University Division independent | Metropolitan Collegiate Conference |
| Virginia Tech Hokies | Southern Conference | University Division independent |
| Wagner Seahawks | non-NCAA University Division | Metropolitan Collegiate Conference |
| West Chester Golden Rams | non-NCAA University Division | Middle Atlantic Conference |

NOTES:
- East Carolina did not begin University Division play until the 1966–1967 season.
- Fairleigh Dickinson did not begin University Division play until the 1967–1968 season.
- Hofstra did not begin University Division play until the 1966–1967 season.
- Long Island did not begin University Division play until the 1968–1969 season.
- West Chester did not begin University Division play until the 1973–1974 season.

== Regular season ==
=== Conferences ===
==== Conference winners and tournaments ====
| Conference | Regular season winner | Conference player of the year | Conference tournament | Tournament venue (City) | Tournament winner |
|---|---|---|---|---|---|
| Athletic Association of Western Universities | Oregon State | None selected | No Tournament | | |
| Atlantic Coast Conference | Duke | Steve Vacendak, Duke | 1966 ACC men's basketball tournament | Reynolds Coliseum (Raleigh, North Carolina) | Duke |
| Big Eight Conference | Kansas | None selected | No Tournament | | |
| Big Sky Conference | Gonzaga & Weber State | None selected | No Tournament | | |
| Big Ten Conference | Michigan | None selected | No Tournament | | |
| Ivy League | Penn | None selected | No Tournament | | |
| Metropolitan Collegiate Conference | Manhattan | | No Tournament | | |
| Mid-American Conference | Miami (OH) | None selected | No Tournament | | |
| Middle Atlantic Conference | Saint Joseph's | | No Tournament | | |
| Missouri Valley Conference | Cincinnati | None selected | No Tournament | | |
| Ohio Valley Conference | Western Kentucky State | Clem Haskins, Western Kentucky State | 1966 Ohio Valley Conference men's basketball tournament | Jefferson County Armory (Louisville, Kentucky) | Western Kentucky State |
| Southeastern Conference | Kentucky | Clyde Lee, Vanderbilt (UPI selection), & Pat Riley, Kentucky (AP selection) | No Tournament | | |
| Southern Conference | Davidson | Dick Snyder, Davidson | 1966 Southern Conference men's basketball tournament | Charlotte Coliseum (Charlotte, North Carolina) | Davidson |
| Southwest Conference | SMU | John Beasley, Texas A&M | No Tournament | | |
| West Coast Athletic Conference | Pacific | Keith Swagerty, Pacific | No Tournament | | |
| Western Athletic Conference | Utah | None selected | No Tournament | | |
| Yankee Conference | Connecticut & Rhode Island | None selected | No Tournament | | |

==== Conference standings ====
1965–66 AAWU Conference men's basketball standings
| | Conf. | | | | Overall |
| Team | W | | L | PCT | W | | L | PCT |
|---|---|---|---|---|---|---|---|---|
| Oregon State | 12 | – | 2 | .857 | 21 | – | 7 | .750 |
| UCLA | 10 | – | 4 | .714 | 18 | – | 8 | .692 |
| Stanford | 8 | – | 6 | .571 | 13 | – | 12 | .520 |
| Washington State | 6 | – | 8 | .429 | 15 | – | 11 | .577 |
| Oregon | 6 | – | 8 | .429 | 13 | – | 13 | .500 |
| USC | 6 | – | 8 | .429 | 13 | – | 13 | .500 |
| Washington | 4 | – | 10 | .286 | 10 | – | 15 | .400 |
| California | 4 | – | 10 | .286 | 9 | – | 16 | .360 |
Rankings from AP Poll

1965–66 ACC men's basketball standings
| | Conf. | | | | Overall |
| Team | W | | L | PCT | W | | L | PCT |
|---|---|---|---|---|---|---|---|---|
| No. 2 Duke † | 12 | – | 2 | .857 | 26 | – | 4 | .867 |
| NC State | 9 | – | 5 | .643 | 18 | – | 9 | .667 |
| Clemson | 8 | – | 6 | .571 | 15 | – | 10 | .600 |
| North Carolina | 8 | – | 6 | .571 | 16 | – | 11 | .593 |
| Maryland | 7 | – | 7 | .500 | 14 | – | 11 | .560 |
| South Carolina | 4 | – | 10 | .286 | 11 | – | 13 | .458 |
| Virginia | 4 | – | 10 | .286 | 7 | – | 15 | .318 |
| Wake Forest | 4 | – | 10 | .286 | 8 | – | 18 | .308 |
† 1966 ACC tournament winner Rankings from AP Poll

1965–66 Big Eight Conference men's basketball standings
| | Conf. | | | | Overall |
| Team | W | | L | PCT | W | | L | PCT |
|---|---|---|---|---|---|---|---|---|
| No. 4 Kansas | 13 | – | 1 | .929 | 23 | – | 4 | .852 |
| Nebraska | 12 | – | 2 | .857 | 20 | – | 5 | .800 |
| Kansas State | 9 | – | 5 | .643 | 14 | – | 11 | .560 |
| Oklahoma | 7 | – | 7 | .500 | 11 | – | 14 | .440 |
| Colorado | 6 | – | 8 | .429 | 12 | – | 13 | .480 |
| Iowa State | 6 | – | 8 | .429 | 11 | – | 14 | .440 |
| Oklahoma State | 2 | – | 12 | .143 | 4 | – | 21 | .160 |
| Missouri | 1 | – | 13 | .071 | 3 | – | 21 | .125 |
Rankings from AP Poll

1965–66 Big Sky men's basketball standings
| | Conf. | | | | Overall |
| Team | W | | L | PCT | W | | L | PCT |
|---|---|---|---|---|---|---|---|---|
| Weber State | 8 | – | 2 | .800 | 20 | – | 5 | .800 |
| Gonzaga | 8 | – | 2 | .800 | 19 | – | 7 | .731 |
| Montana | 6 | – | 5 | .545 | 14 | – | 10 | .583 |
| Montana State | 5 | – | 5 | .500 | 7 | – | 15 | .318 |
| Idaho | 2 | – | 8 | .200 | 12 | – | 14 | .462 |
| Idaho State | 1 | – | 9 | .100 | 7 | – | 19 | .269 |

1965–66 Big Ten Conference men's basketball standings
| | Conf. | | | | Overall |
| Team | W | | L | PCT | W | | L | PCT |
|---|---|---|---|---|---|---|---|---|
| No. 9 Michigan | 11 | – | 3 | .786 | 18 | – | 8 | .692 |
| Michigan State | 10 | – | 4 | .714 | 15 | – | 7 | .682 |
| Iowa | 8 | – | 6 | .571 | 17 | – | 7 | .708 |
| Illinois | 8 | – | 6 | .571 | 12 | – | 12 | .500 |
| Minnesota | 7 | – | 7 | .500 | 14 | – | 10 | .583 |
| Northwestern | 7 | – | 7 | .500 | 12 | – | 12 | .500 |
| Wisconsin | 6 | – | 8 | .429 | 11 | – | 13 | .458 |
| Ohio State | 5 | – | 9 | .357 | 11 | – | 13 | .458 |
| Indiana | 4 | – | 10 | .286 | 8 | – | 16 | .333 |
| Purdue | 4 | – | 10 | .286 | 8 | – | 16 | .333 |
Rankings from AP Poll

1965–66 Ivy League men's basketball standings
| | Conf. | | | | Overall |
| Team | W | | L | PCT | W | | L | PCT |
|---|---|---|---|---|---|---|---|---|
| Pennsylvania | 12 | – | 2 | .857 | 19 | – | 6 | .760 |
| Columbia | 10 | – | 4 | .714 | 18 | – | 6 | .750 |
| Cornell | 10 | – | 4 | .714 | 15 | – | 9 | .625 |
| Princeton | 9 | – | 5 | .643 | 16 | – | 7 | .696 |
| Yale | 6 | – | 8 | .429 | 9 | – | 12 | .429 |
| Harvard | 6 | – | 8 | .429 | 10 | – | 14 | .417 |
| Brown | 3 | – | 11 | .214 | 9 | – | 17 | .346 |
| Dartmouth | 0 | – | 14 | .000 | 3 | – | 21 | .125 |
Rankings from AP Poll

1965–66 Metropolitan Collegiate Conference men's basketball standings
| | Conf. | | | | Overall |
| Team | W | | L | PCT | W | | L | PCT |
|---|---|---|---|---|---|---|---|---|
| Manhattan | 8 | – | 1 | .889 | 13 | – | 9 | .591 |
| LIU | 7 | – | 2 | .778 | 22 | – | 4 | .846 |
| NYU | 7 | – | 2 | .778 | 18 | – | 10 | .643 |
| Hofstra | 6 | – | 3 | .667 | 16 | – | 10 | .615 |
| Fairleigh Dickinson | 5 | – | 4 | .556 | 15 | – | 10 | .600 |
| Saint Peter's | 5 | – | 4 | .556 | 11 | – | 12 | .478 |
| Seton Hall | 3 | – | 6 | .333 | 6 | – | 18 | .250 |
| Iona | 3 | – | 6 | .333 | 5 | – | 16 | .238 |
| Wagner | 1 | – | 8 | .111 | 14 | – | 12 | .538 |
| St. Francis (NY) | 0 | – | 9 | .000 | 5 | – | 17 | .227 |
Rankings from AP Poll

1965–66 Mid-American Conference men's basketball standings
| | Conf. | | | | Overall |
| Team | W | | L | PCT | W | | L | PCT |
|---|---|---|---|---|---|---|---|---|
| Miami (Ohio) | 11 | – | 1 | .917 | 18 | – | 7 | .720 |
| Toledo | 8 | – | 4 | .667 | 13 | – | 11 | .542 |
| Ohio | 6 | – | 6 | .500 | 13 | – | 10 | .565 |
| Bowling Green State | 6 | – | 6 | .500 | 9 | – | 15 | .375 |
| Marshall | 4 | – | 8 | .333 | 12 | – | 12 | .500 |
| Western Michigan | 4 | – | 8 | .333 | 8 | – | 14 | .364 |
| Kent State | 3 | – | 9 | .250 | 8 | – | 16 | .333 |
Rankings from AP Poll

1965–66 MAC men's basketball standings
| | Conf. | | | | Overall |
| Team | W | | L | PCT | W | | L | PCT |
|---|---|---|---|---|---|---|---|---|
| No. 5 Saint Joseph's† | 4 | – | 0 | 1.000 | 24 | – | 5 | .828 |
| Bucknell | 7 | – | 2 | .778 | 15 | – | 10 | .600 |
| Lafayette | 7 | – | 4 | .636 | 9 | – | 11 | .450 |
| Temple | 5 | – | 3 | .625 | 21 | – | 7 | .750 |
| La Salle | 3 | – | 3 | .500 | 10 | – | 15 | .400 |
| Delaware | 4 | – | 5 | .444 | 9 | – | 15 | .375 |
| Gettysburg | 3 | – | 7 | .300 | 9 | – | 15 | .375 |
| Lehigh | 0 | – | 9 | .000 | 4 | – | 17 | .190 |
| West Chester (Pa.)* | | – | | – | 6 | – | 17 | .261 |
† Regular-season championship winner * – Played as non-major program Rankings from AP Poll

1965–66 Missouri Valley Conference men's basketball standings
| | Conf. | | | | Overall |
| Team | W | | L | PCT | W | | L | PCT |
|---|---|---|---|---|---|---|---|---|
| No. 7 Cincinnati | 10 | – | 4 | .714 | 21 | – | 7 | .750 |
| Bradley | 9 | – | 5 | .643 | 20 | – | 6 | .769 |
| Wichita State | 9 | – | 5 | .643 | 17 | – | 10 | .630 |
| Louisville | 8 | – | 6 | .571 | 16 | – | 10 | .615 |
| Saint Louis | 8 | – | 6 | .571 | 15 | – | 10 | .600 |
| Tulsa | 6 | – | 8 | .429 | 16 | – | 13 | .552 |
| Drake | 6 | – | 8 | .429 | 13 | – | 12 | .520 |
| North Texas State | 0 | – | 14 | .000 | 5 | – | 20 | .200 |
Rankings from AP Poll

1965–66 Ohio Valley Conference men's basketball standings
| | Conf. | | | | Overall |
| Team | W | | L | PCT | W | | L | PCT |
|---|---|---|---|---|---|---|---|---|
| No. 10 Western Kentucky State | 14 | – | 0 | 1.000 | 25 | – | 3 | .893 |
| Eastern Kentucky State | 9 | – | 5 | .643 | 16 | – | 9 | .640 |
| Tennessee Tech | 8 | – | 6 | .571 | 17 | – | 8 | .680 |
| Murray State | 8 | – | 6 | .571 | 13 | – | 12 | .520 |
| Morehead State | 8 | – | 6 | .571 | 12 | – | 12 | .500 |
| Austin Peay State | 3 | – | 11 | .214 | 7 | – | 14 | .333 |
| East Tennessee State | 3 | – | 11 | .214 | 7 | – | 14 | .333 |
| Middle Tennessee | 3 | – | 11 | .214 | 7 | – | 17 | .292 |
Rankings from AP Poll

1965–66 Southeastern Conference men's basketball standings
| | Conf. | | | | Overall |
| Team | W | | L | PCT | W | | L | PCT |
|---|---|---|---|---|---|---|---|---|
| No. 1 Kentucky | 15 | – | 1 | .938 | 27 | – | 2 | .931 |
| No. 8 Vanderbilt | 13 | – | 3 | .813 | 22 | – | 4 | .846 |
| Tennessee | 10 | – | 6 | .625 | 18 | – | 8 | .692 |
| Mississippi State | 10 | – | 6 | .625 | 14 | – | 11 | .560 |
| Alabama | 9 | – | 7 | .563 | 16 | – | 10 | .615 |
| Florida | 9 | – | 7 | .563 | 16 | – | 10 | .615 |
| Auburn | 8 | – | 8 | .500 | 16 | – | 10 | .615 |
| Georgia | 5 | – | 11 | .313 | 10 | – | 15 | .400 |
| Tulane | 5 | – | 11 | .313 | 9 | – | 16 | .360 |
| LSU | 2 | – | 14 | .125 | 6 | – | 20 | .231 |
| Ole Miss | 2 | – | 14 | .125 | 5 | – | 18 | .217 |
Rankings from AP Poll

1965–66 Southern Conference men's basketball standings
| | Conf. | | | | Overall |
| Team | W | | L | PCT | W | | L | PCT |
|---|---|---|---|---|---|---|---|---|
| Davidson † | 11 | – | 1 | .917 | 21 | – | 7 | .750 |
| West Virginia | 8 | – | 2 | .800 | 19 | – | 9 | .679 |
| William & Mary | 8 | – | 3 | .727 | 13 | – | 12 | .520 |
| Richmond | 9 | – | 7 | .563 | 12 | – | 13 | .480 |
| East Carolina | 5 | – | 7 | .417 | 11 | – | 15 | .423 |
| Furman | 4 | – | 8 | .333 | 9 | – | 17 | .346 |
| VMI | 5 | – | 11 | .313 | 5 | – | 18 | .217 |
| The Citadel | 4 | – | 9 | .308 | 7 | – | 16 | .304 |
| George Washington | 3 | – | 9 | .250 | 3 | – | 18 | .143 |
† Southern Conference Tournament winner Rankings from AP Poll

1965–66 Southwest Conference men's basketball standings
| | Conf. | | | | Overall |
| Team | W | | L | PCT | W | | L | PCT |
|---|---|---|---|---|---|---|---|---|
| SMU | 11 | – | 3 | .786 | 17 | – | 9 | .654 |
| Texas A&M | 10 | – | 4 | .714 | 15 | – | 9 | .625 |
| Texas Tech | 8 | – | 6 | .571 | 13 | – | 11 | .542 |
| Arkansas | 7 | – | 7 | .500 | 13 | – | 10 | .565 |
| Texas | 7 | – | 7 | .500 | 12 | – | 12 | .500 |
| Baylor | 6 | – | 8 | .429 | 8 | – | 16 | .333 |
| TCU | 6 | – | 8 | .429 | 8 | – | 16 | .333 |
| Rice | 1 | – | 13 | .071 | 1 | – | 22 | .043 |
Rankings from AP Poll

1965–66 West Coast Athletic Conference men's basketball standings
| | Conf. | | | | Overall |
| Team | W | | L | PCT | W | | L | PCT |
|---|---|---|---|---|---|---|---|---|
| Pacific | 13 | – | 1 | .929 | 22 | – | 6 | .786 |
| San Francisco | 11 | – | 3 | .786 | 22 | – | 6 | .786 |
| Santa Clara | 8 | – | 6 | .571 | 16 | – | 11 | .593 |
| Loyola (Calif.) | 7 | – | 7 | .500 | 11 | – | 15 | .423 |
| San Jose State | | – | | – | 11 | – | 13 | .458 |
| UC Santa Barbara | 5 | – | 9 | .357 | 10 | – | 16 | .385 |
| Saint Mary's | 4 | – | 10 | .286 | 8 | – | 17 | .320 |
| Pepperdine | 1 | – | 13 | .071 | 2 | – | 24 | .077 |
Rankings from AP Poll

1965–66 WAC men's basketball standings
| | Conf. | | | | Overall |
| Team | W | | L | PCT | W | | L | PCT |
|---|---|---|---|---|---|---|---|---|
| Utah | 7 | – | 3 | .700 | 23 | – | 8 | .742 |
| BYU | 6 | – | 4 | .600 | 20 | – | 5 | .800 |
| Wyoming | 5 | – | 5 | .500 | 17 | – | 9 | .654 |
| Arizona | 5 | – | 5 | .500 | 15 | – | 11 | .577 |
| New Mexico | 4 | – | 6 | .400 | 16 | – | 8 | .667 |
| Arizona State | 3 | – | 7 | .300 | 12 | – | 14 | .462 |
Rankings from AP Poll

1965–66 Yankee Conference men's basketball standings
| | Conf. | | | | Overall |
| Team | W | | L | PCT | W | | L | PCT |
|---|---|---|---|---|---|---|---|---|
| Rhode Island | 9 | – | 1 | .900 | 20 | – | 8 | .714 |
| Connecticut | 9 | – | 1 | .900 | 16 | – | 8 | .667 |
| Massachusetts | 5 | – | 5 | .500 | 11 | – | 13 | .458 |
| Maine | 4 | – | 6 | .400 | 9 | – | 13 | .409 |
| Vermont | 3 | – | 7 | .300 | 12 | – | 8 | .600 |
| New Hampshire | 0 | – | 10 | .000 | 3 | – | 21 | .125 |

=== University Division independents ===
A total of 49 college teams played as University Division independents. Among them, Texas Western (28–1) had both the best winning percentage (.966) and the most wins.

1965–66 NCAA University Division men's basketball independents standings
| | Conf. | | | | Overall |
| Team | W | | L | PCT | W | | L | PCT |
|---|---|---|---|---|---|---|---|---|
| No. 3 Texas Western | | – | | – | 28 | – | 1 | .966 |
| No. 6 Loyola Chicago | | – | | – | 22 | – | 3 | .880 |
| Oklahoma City | | – | | – | 24 | – | 5 | .828 |
| Providence | | – | | – | 22 | – | 5 | .815 |
| Boston College | | – | | – | 21 | – | 5 | .808 |
| Dayton | | – | | – | 23 | – | 6 | .793 |
| Houston | | – | | – | 23 | – | 6 | .793 |
| Fairfield | | – | | – | 19 | – | 5 | .792 |
| VPI | | – | | – | 19 | – | 5 | .792 |
| Syracuse | | – | | – | 22 | – | 6 | .786 |
| Hardin–Simmons | | – | | – | 20 | – | 6 | .769 |
| Penn State | | – | | – | 18 | – | 6 | .750 |
| Rutgers | | – | | – | 17 | – | 7 | .708 |
| St. Bonaventure | | – | | – | 16 | – | 7 | .696 |
| Army | | – | | – | 18 | – | 8 | .692 |
| DePaul | | – | | – | 18 | – | 8 | .692 |
| St. John's | | – | | – | 18 | – | 8 | .692 |
| Detroit | | – | | – | 17 | – | 8 | .680 |
| Georgetown | | – | | – | 16 | – | 8 | .667 |
| Colorado State | | – | | – | 14 | – | 8 | .636 |
| Villanova | | – | | – | 18 | – | 11 | .621 |
| Butler | | – | | – | 16 | – | 10 | .615 |
| Seattle | | – | | – | 16 | – | 10 | .615 |
| Duquesne | | – | | – | 14 | – | 9 | .609 |
| Miami (FL) | | – | | – | 15 | – | 11 | .577 |
| Denver | | – | | – | 14 | – | 11 | .560 |
| Florida State | | – | | – | 14 | – | 11 | .560 |
| Air Force | | – | | – | 14 | – | 12 | .538 |
| Creighton | | – | | – | 14 | – | 12 | .538 |
| Marquette | | – | | – | 14 | – | 12 | .538 |
| Georgia Tech | | – | | – | 13 | – | 13 | .500 |
| Xavier | | – | | – | 13 | – | 13 | .500 |
| Loyola (LA) | | – | | – | 12 | – | 12 | .500 |
| Centenary | | – | | – | 12 | – | 14 | .462 |
| Utah State | | – | | – | 12 | – | 14 | .462 |
| Niagara | | – | | – | 11 | – | 13 | .458 |
| Holy Cross | | – | | – | 10 | – | 13 | .435 |
| Fordham | | – | | – | 10 | – | 15 | .400 |
| Memphis State | | – | | – | 10 | – | 15 | .400 |
| Navy | | – | | – | 7 | – | 12 | .368 |
| Colgate | | – | | – | 8 | – | 14 | .364 |
| Canisius | | – | | – | 7 | – | 15 | .318 |
| Saint Francis (PA) | | – | | – | 8 | – | 18 | .308 |
| West Texas State | | – | | – | 6 | – | 17 | .261 |
| Portland | | – | | – | 6 | – | 19 | .240 |
| Pittsburgh | | – | | – | 5 | – | 17 | .227 |
| Notre Dame | | – | | – | 5 | – | 21 | .192 |
| Boston University | | – | | – | 4 | – | 19 | .174 |
| New Mexico State | | – | | – | 4 | – | 22 | .154 |
Rankings from AP Poll

=== Informal championships ===
| Conference | Regular season winner | Most Valuable Player |
|---|---|---|
| Philadelphia Big 5 | Saint Joseph's | Bill Melchionni, Villanova |

Saint Joseph's finished with a 4–0 record in head-to-head competition among the Philadelphia Big 5.

== Post-season tournaments ==
=== NCAA tournament ===
==== Final Four ====
National Semi-finals
E | Duke | 79
ME | Kentucky | 83
MW | Texas Western | 85
W | Utah | 78

National finals
ME | Kentucky | 65
MW | Texas Western | 72
Third place
E | Duke | 79
W | Utah | 77

=== National Invitation tournament ===
==== Semi-finals and Finals ====
Semi-finals
BYU | 66
Army | 60
NYU | 69
Villanova | 63

Finals
BYU | 97
NYU | 84
Third place
Army | 65
Villanova | 76

== Awards ==
=== Consensus All-American teams ===
Consensus First Team
| Player | Position | Class | Team |
|---|---|---|---|
| Dave Bing | G | Senior | Syracuse |
| Clyde Lee | F | Senior | Vanderbilt |
| Cazzie Russell | F | Senior | Michigan |
| Dave Schellhase | G/F | Senior | Purdue |
| Jimmy Walker | G | Junior | Providence |

Consensus Second Team
| Player | Position | Class | Team |
|---|---|---|---|
| Louie Dampier | G | Junior | Kentucky |
| Matt Guokas | G | Junior | St. Joseph's |
| Jack Marin | F | Senior | Duke |
| Dick Snyder | F | Senior | Davidson |
| Bob Verga | G | Senior | Duke |
| Walt Wesley | C | Senior | Kansas |

=== Major player of the year awards ===
- Helms Player of the Year: Cazzie Russell, Michigan
- Associated Press Player of the Year: Cazzie Russell, Michigan
- UPI Player of the Year: Cazzie Russell, Michigan
- Oscar Robertson Trophy (USBWA): Cazzie Russell, Michigan
- Sporting News Player of the Year: Cazzie Russell, Michigan

=== Major coach of the year awards ===
- Henry Iba Award: Adolph Rupp, Kentucky
- NABC Coach of the Year: Adolph Rupp, Kentucky
- UPI Coach of the Year: Adolph Rupp, Kentucky
- Sporting News Coach of the Year: Adolph Rupp, Kentucky

=== Other major awards ===
- Robert V. Geasey Trophy (Top player in Philadelphia Big 5): Bill Melchionni, Villanova
- NIT/Haggerty Award (Top player in New York City metro area): Albie Grant, LIU Brooklyn

== Coaching changes ==
A number of teams changed coaches during the season and after it ended.

| Team | Former Coach | Interim Coach | New Coach | Reason |
|---|---|---|---|---|
| Arkansas | Glen Rose | | Duddy Waller | |
| Boston University | John H. Burke Jr. | | Charlie Luce | |
| Delaware | Irv Wisniewski | | Dan Peterson | |
| East Carolina | Wendell Carr | | Tom Quinn | |
| Fairleigh Dickinson | Dick Holub | | Jack Devine | |
| Florida | Norm Sloan | | Tommy Bartlett | Sloan left to coach NC State. Florida hired Tennessee assistant coach Bartlett. |
| Florida State | J. K. Kennedy | | Hugh Durham | |
| Furman | Lyles Alley | | Frank Selvy | |
| George Washington | Bill Reinhart | | Babe McCarthy | |
| Georgetown | Tommy O'Keefe | | Jack Magee | Able to sustain himself financially only by working outside of basketball to supplement the low salary of Georgetown's head coaching position, and lacking the time to recruit players properly while coaching only part-time, O'Keefe — Georgetown's head coach for six seasons — resigned after the season to devote himself full-time to his business concerns. His resignation prompted Georgetown to commit to hiring a full-time coach beginning with the following season. |
| Hardin–Simmons | Lou Henson | | Paul Lambert | |
| Idaho | Jim Goddard | | Wayne Anderson | |
| Kent State | Robert F. Doll | | Frank Truitt | |
| Lehigh | Tony Packer | | Pete Carril | |
| Loyola (LA) | Bill Gardiner | | Ron Greene | |
| LSU | Frank Truitt | | Press Maravich | Truitt left to coach Kent State. Maravich was hired from NC State. |
| Massachusetts | Johnny Orr | | Jack Leaman | |
| Memphis State | Dean Ehlers | | Moe Iba | |
| Miami (OH) | Dick Shrider | | Tates Locke | |
| Navy | Ben Carnevale | | Dave Smalley | |
| NC State | Press Maravich | | Norm Sloan | Maravich left to coach LSU. Sloan was hired from Florida. |
| New Hampshire | Bill Olson | | Bill Haubrich | |
| New Mexico State | Jim McGregor | | Lou Henson | |
| Pennsylvania | Jack McCloskey | | Dick Harter | McCoskey left to coach Wake Forest. |
| Rice | George Carlisle | | Don Knodel | |
| Saint Francis | Skip Hughes | | John Clark | |
| Saint Joseph's | Jack Ramsay | | Jack McKinney | |
| San Francisco | Pete Peletta | | Phil Vukicevich | |
| UC Santa Barbara | Art Gallon | | Ralph Barkey | |
| USC | Forrest Twogood | | Bob Boyd | |
| Wake Forest | Jack Murdock | | Jack McCloskey | |
| Western Michigan | Don Boven | | Sonny Means | |
| William & Mary | Bill Chambers | | Warren Mitchell | |
