= 1965–66 NCAA University Division men's basketball rankings =

- Season: 1965–66
- NCAA Tournament: 1966
- Preseason No. 1: UCLA
- NCAA Tournament Champions: Texas Western
NCAA University Division men's basketball rankings


The 1965–66 NCAA University Division men's basketball rankings was made up of two human polls, the AP Poll and the Coaches Poll.

== Legend ==
	Increase in ranking
	Decrease in ranking
	New to rankings from previous week
Italics	Number of first place votes
(#–#)	Win–loss record
т	Tied with team above or below also with this symbol

== AP Poll ==
All AP polls for this season included only ten ranked teams.

	Preseason	Week 2 Dec. 7	Week 3 Dec. 14	Week 4 Dec. 21	Week 5 Dec. 28	Week 6 Jan. 4	Week 7 Jan. 11	Week 8 Jan. 18	Week 9 Jan. 25	Week 10 Feb. 1	Week 11 Feb. 8	Week 12 Feb. 15	Week 13 Feb. 22	Week 14 Mar. 1	Final Mar. 8	
1.	UCLA	UCLA (2–0)	Duke (4–1)	Duke (6–1)	Duke (7–1)	Duke (9–1)	Duke (11–1)	Duke (14–1)	Duke (14–1)	Duke (15–1)	Kentucky (17–0)	Kentucky (19–0)	Kentucky (21–0)	Kentucky (23–0)	Kentucky (23–1)	1.
2.	Michigan	Michigan (3–0)	Saint Joseph's (4–0)	Saint Joseph's (6–0)	Vanderbilt (8–0)	Kentucky (8–0)	Kentucky (10–0)	Kentucky (12–0)	Kentucky (12–0)	Kentucky (14–0)	Duke (15–1)	Duke (17–2)	Duke (19–2)	Texas Western (22–0)	Duke (23–3)	2.
3.	Duke	Saint Joseph's (2–0)	Michigan (4–1)	Michigan (4–1)	Bradley (10–0)	Vanderbilt (10–1)	Vanderbilt (12–1)	Saint Joseph's (11–2)	Providence (12–1)	Vanderbilt (15–2)	Loyola-Chicago (16–1)	Texas Western (18–0)	Texas Western (20–0)	Duke (20–3)	Texas Western (23–1)	3.
4.	Saint Joseph's	Vanderbilt (1–0)	Kansas (5–0)	Vanderbilt (6–0)	Iowa (7–0)	Saint Joseph's (9–2)	Saint Joseph's (10–2)	Providence (12–1)	Vanderbilt (14–2)	Providence (13–1)	Texas Western (16–0)	Loyola-Chicago (17–2)	Loyola-Chicago (20–2)	Loyola-Chicago (21–2)	Kansas (21–3)	4.
5.	Vanderbilt	Minnesota (2–0)	Vanderbilt (4–0)	Bradley (8–0)	Kentucky (7–0)	Bradley (10–1)	Bradley (13–1)	Vanderbilt (14–2)	Saint Joseph's (13–3)	Loyola-Chicago (15–1)	Vanderbilt (16–3)	Vanderbilt (17–3)	Vanderbilt (19–3)	Vanderbilt (21–3)	St. Joseph's (22–4)	5.
6.	Providence	Duke (2–0)	Minnesota (3–0)	Minnesota (4–0)	BYU (6–0)	Providence (8–1)	Providence (10–1)	Kansas (13–2)	Texas Western (12–0)	Texas Western (14–0)	Providence (15–1)	Providence (17–2)	Kansas (18–3)	Kansas (20–3)	Loyola-Chicago (21–2)	6.
7.	Minnesota	Kansas (2–0)	Providence (3–0)	Providence (5–0)	Michigan (4–3)	Iowa (8–1)	BYU (10–1)	Bradley (14–2)	Loyola-Chicago (13–1)	Kansas (14–3)	Kansas (15–3)	Kansas (16–3)	Saint Joseph's (19–4)	Saint Joseph's (21–4)	Cincinnati (21–5)	7.
8.	Kansas	Providence (1–0)	UCLA (2–2)	Wichita State (4–0)	Saint Joseph's (6–2)	BYU (8–1)	Texas Western (12–0)	Texas Western (12–0)	Cincinnati (13–2)	Saint Joseph's (13–4)	Saint Joseph's (15–4)	Saint Joseph's (17–4)	Nebraska (17–3)	Providence (21–3)	Vanderbilt (22–4)	8.
9.	Bradley	Bradley (1–0)	Bradley (6–0)	Iowa (7–0)	Minnesota (5–1)	Texas Western (10–0)	UCLA (9–3)	Loyola-Chicago (13–1)	Kansas (14–3)	Michigan (11–4)	Nebraska (14–2)	Nebraska (16–3)	Providence (19–3)	Nebraska (18–4)	Michigan (17–6)	9.
10.	Kansas State	South Carolina (2–0)	Wichita State (3–0)	Kentucky (6–0)	Providence (5–1)	UCLA (7–3)	Kansas (11–2)	UCLA (10–4)	UCLA (10–4)	Cincinnati (14–3)	Michigan (12–5)	Michigan (13–5)	Michigan (14–5)	Cincinnati (20–5)	Western Kentucky (24–2)	10.
	Preseason	Week 2 Dec. 7	Week 3 Dec. 14	Week 4 Dec. 21	Week 5 Dec. 28	Week 6 Jan. 4	Week 7 Jan. 11	Week 8 Jan. 18	Week 9 Jan. 25	Week 10 Feb. 1	Week 11 Feb. 8	Week 12 Feb. 15	Week 13 Feb. 22	Week 14 Mar. 1	Final Mar. 8	
		Dropped: Kansas State	Dropped: South Carolina (4–0)	Dropped: Kansas (5–2); UCLA (3–3)	Dropped: Wichita State (4–2)	Dropped: Michigan (6–4); Minnesota (7–3)	Dropped: Iowa (8–2)	Dropped: BYU (10–3)	Dropped: Bradley (14–3)	Dropped: UCLA (10–5)	Dropped: Cincinnati (14–5)	None	None	Dropped: Michigan (15–6)	Dropped: Providence (22–4); Nebraska (20–5)	

== UPI Poll ==
	Preseason	Week 2 Dec. 6	Week 3 Dec. 13	Week 4 Dec. 20	Week 5 Dec. 27	Week 6 Jan. 3	Week 7 Jan. 10	Week 8 Jan. 17	Week 9 Jan. 24	Week 10 Jan. 31	Week 11 Feb. 7	Week 12 Feb. 14	Week 13 Feb. 21	Week 14 Feb. 28	Final Mar. 7	
1.	UCLA	UCLA (2–0)	Duke (4–1)	Duke (6–1)	Duke (7–1)	Duke (9–1)	Duke (11–1)	Duke (14–1)	Duke (14–1)	Duke (15–1)	Kentucky (17–0)	Kentucky (19–0)	Kentucky (21–0)	Kentucky (23–0)	Kentucky (23–1)	1.
2.	Michigan	Michigan (3–0)	Saint Joseph's (4–0)	Saint Joseph's (6–0)	Vanderbilt (8–0)	Kentucky (8–0)	Kentucky (10–0)	Kentucky (12–0)	Kentucky (12–0)	Kentucky (14–0)	Duke (15–1)	Duke (17–2)	Duke (19–2)	Duke (20–3)	Duke (23–3)	2.
3.	Minnesota	Saint Joseph's (2–0)	Vanderbilt (4–0)	Vanderbilt (6–0)	BYU (6–0)	Vanderbilt (10–1)	Vanderbilt (12–1)	Saint Joseph's (11–2)	Providence (12–1)	Vanderbilt (15–2)	Loyola-Chicago (16–1)	Texas Western (18–0)	Texas Western (20–0)	Texas Western (22–0)	Texas Western (23–1)	3.
4.	Saint Joseph's	Duke (2–0)	Kansas (5–0)	Minnesota (4–0)	Bradley (10–0)	Saint Joseph's (9–2)	Saint Joseph's (10–2)	Providence (12–1)	Vanderbilt (14–2)	Providence (13–1)	Providence (15–1)	Providence (17–2)	Loyola-Chicago (20–2)	Loyola-Chicago (21–2)	Kansas (21–3)	4.
5.	Duke	Minnesota (2–0)	Michigan (4–1)	Michigan (4–1)	Kentucky (7–0)	BYU (8–1)	Bradley (13–1)	Vanderbilt (14–2)	Saint Joseph's (13–3)	Loyola-Chicago (15–1)	Texas Western (16–0)	Loyola-Chicago (17–2)	Kansas (18–3)	Kansas (20–3)	Loyola-Chicago (21–2)	5.
6.	Vanderbilt	Vanderbilt (1–0)	Minnesota (3–0)	Providence (5–0)	Iowa (7–0)	Providence (8–1)	BYU (10–1)	Bradley (14–2)	Texas Western (12–0)	Texas Western (14–0)	Kansas (15–3)	Saint Joseph's (17–4)	Vanderbilt (19–3)	Saint Joseph's (21–4)	St. Joseph's (22–4)	6.
7.	Providence	Kansas (2–0)	Providence (3–0)	Wichita State (4–0)	Saint Joseph's (6–2)	Bradley (10–1)	Providence (10–1)	Kansas (13–2)	Loyola-Chicago (13–1)	Kansas (14–3)	Vanderbilt (16–3)	Kansas (16–3)	Saint Joseph's (19–4)	Vanderbilt (21–3)	Michigan (17–6)	7.
8.	Kansas	Providence (1–0)	UCLA (2–2)	BYU (4–0)	Providence (5–1)	UCLA (7–3)	UCLA (9–3)	Texas Western (12–0)	Bradley (14–3)	Saint Joseph's (13–4)	Saint Joseph's (15–4)	Vanderbilt (17–3)	Providence (19–3)	Providence (21–3)	Vanderbilt (22–4)	8.
9.	Bradley	BYU (1–0)	BYU (2–0)	Iowa (7–0) т	Michigan (4–3)	Iowa (8–1) т	Texas Western (12–0)	Loyola-Chicago (13–1)	Kansas (14–3)	Michigan (11–4)	Nebraska (14–2)	Nebraska (16–3)	Michigan (14–5)	Michigan (15–6)	Cincinnati (21–5)	9.
10.	BYU	Bradley (1–0)	Wichita State (3–0)	Kentucky (6–0) т	Minnesota (5–1)	Kansas (9–2) т	Kansas (11–2)	Utah (12–3)	Cincinnati (13–2)	Cincinnati (14–3)	Michigan (12–5)	Michigan (13–5)	Nebraska (17–3)	Cincinnati (20–5)	Providence (22–4)	10.
11.	San Francisco	San Francisco (2–1)	Bradley (6–0)	Bradley (8–0)	UCLA (5–3)	Texas Western (10–0)	Loyola-Chicago (11–1)	BYU (10–3)	Michigan State (10–4)	Utah (14–3)	Cincinnati (14–5) т	San Francisco (16–3)	Cincinnati (18–5)	Utah (20–5)	Nebraska (20–5)	11.
12.	Kansas State	Iowa (3–0)	Iowa (5–0)	Kansas (5–2)	Kansas (6–2)	Cincinnati (8–1)	Iowa (8–2)	UCLA (10–4)	Utah (13–3)	Nebraska (13–2)	San Francisco (15–2) т	Cincinnati (16–5)	Utah (18–5)	San Francisco (20–4)	Utah (21–6)	12.
13.	NC State	Kentucky (2–0)	Kentucky (4–0)	UCLA (3–3)	Syracuse (7–0)	Syracuse (9–2)	New Mexico (10–1)	Michigan (9–4)	Nebraska (13–2)	Bradley (14–4) т	Utah (14–4)	Syracuse (15–3)	San Francisco (18–3)	Nebraska (18–4)	Oklahoma City (18–5)	13.
14.	Dayton	Louisville (2–0)	South Carolina (4–0)	Syracuse (7–0)	NC State (3–2) т	Loyola-Chicago (9–1)	Dayton (10–1)	Cincinnati (11–2)	UCLA (10–4)	St. John's (11–3) т	Dayton (15–3)	BYU (14–3) т	Western Kentucky (19–2)	Oregon State (17–6)	Houston (21–5)	14.
15.	Boston College т	NC State (1–0)	Oklahoma City (5–0)	Cincinnati (5–1) т	Utah (7–0) т	Minnesota (7–3)	Tulsa (12–3) т	New Mexico (11–2) т	St. John's (10–3)	Dayton (14–3)	St. John's (12–4) т	Utah (17–4) т	Houston (18–4)	Syracuse (19–5)	Oregon State (20–6)	15.
16.	St. John's т	New Mexico (2–0) т	New Mexico (4–0) т	Utah (6–0) т	Cincinnati (6–1) т	Michigan (6–4)	Utah (10–3) т	San Francisco (12–2) т	San Francisco (12–2)	San Francisco (13–2)	Syracuse (13–3) т	Houston (17–4)	Syracuse (18–4)	Dayton (21–4)	Syracuse (21–5)	16.
17.	Louisville т	Ohio State (1–2) т	Saint Louis (4–0) т	Dayton (6–0) т	Wichita State (4–2) т	Utah (8–2)	Louisville (9–3)	Michigan State (10–3)	BYU (11–3)	BYU (11–3)	BYU (12–3)	St. John's (14–4)	St. John's (16–4)	Western Kentucky (21–2)	Pacific (22–4)	17.
18.	Tennessee т	Boston College (1–0) т	Florida (3–0)	NC State (2–1) т	Dayton (7–0)	DePaul (8–1) т	Western Kentucky (10–1)	Nebraska (12–2)	Dayton (13–3) т	New Mexico (12–2)	Illinois (9–7)	Oklahoma City (12–4)	Oklahoma City (15–5)	Pacific (20–4)	Davidson (20–5)	18.
19.	West Virginia	Tennessee (0–1) т	NC State (1–1) т	Colorado State (5–0) т	New Mexico (6–1)	New Mexico (9–1) т	Temple (12–1) т	Iowa (9–3)	Tulsa (13–4) т	Oklahoma City (9–4) т	Bradley (15–4)	Western Kentucky (17–2)	Oregon State (16–6)	Oklahoma City (17–5)	BYU (17–5) т	19.
20.	Iowa т New Mexico т Princeton т	Dayton (2–0)	Utah (4–0) т	San Francisco (5–2) т	North Carolina (6–2)	Oregon State (6–3)	Texas A&M (7–4) т	NC State (8–4)	Iowa (10–3) т Syracuse (11–3) т	Tulsa (13–6) т	Michigan State (13–4)	Dayton (17–3)	Boston College (16–4) т Tennessee (17–6) т	Boston College (19–4) т Michigan State (16–6) т	Dayton (23–4) т	20.
	Preseason	Week 2 Dec. 6	Week 3 Dec. 13	Week 4 Dec. 20	Week 5 Dec. 27	Week 6 Jan. 3	Week 7 Jan. 10	Week 8 Jan. 17	Week 9 Jan. 24	Week 10 Jan. 31	Week 11 Feb. 7	Week 12 Feb. 14	Week 13 Feb. 21	Week 14 Feb. 28	Final Mar. 7	
		Dropped: Kansas State; St. John's; West Virginia; Princeton	Dropped: San Francisco; Louisville; Ohio State; Boston College; Tennessee; Dayton	Dropped: South Carolina; Oklahoma City; New Mexico; Saint Louis; Florida	Dropped: Colorado State; San Francisco	Dropped: NC State; Wichita State; Dayton; North Carolina	Dropped: Cincinnati; Syracuse; Minnesota; Michigan; DePaul; Oregon State	Dropped: Tulsa; Louisville; Western Kentucky; Temple; Texas A&M	Dropped: Michigan; NC State	Dropped: UCLA; Iowa; Syracuse	Dropped: New Mexico; Oklahoma City; Tulsa	Dropped: Illinois; Bradley; Michigan State	Dropped: BYU; Dayton	Dropped: Houston; Tennessee	Dropped: San Francisco (20–5); Western Kentucky; Boston College (19–5); Michigan State (16–7)	
