= List of New Hampshire Wildcats men's basketball head coaches =

The following is a list of New Hampshire Wildcats men's basketball head coaches. There have been 20 head coaches of the Wildcats in their 118-season history.

New Hampshire's most recent head coach was Bill Herrion. His contract was not renewed following the 2022–23 season.

No.	Tenure	Coach	Years	Record	Pct.
–	1902–1907; 1908–1910; 1914–1915	No coach	8	38–38	.500
1	1907–1908	Alexander Gion	1	8–3	.727
2	1910–1911	Ray B. Thomas	1	6–3	.667
3	1911–1912	Percy Reynolds	1	7–4	.636
4	1912–1913	Tod Eberle	1	5–5	.500
5	1915–1916	Carl Reed	1	6–7	.462
6	1916–1928	Butch Cowell	12	119–54	.688
7	1928–1938; 1939–1946 (Note: New Hampshire did not field a team for the 1943–44 or 1944–45 seasons.)	Henry Swasey	15	108–118	.478
8	1938–1939	George Sauer	1	3–14	.176
9	1946–1950	Ed Stanczyk	4	22–44	.333
10	1950–1951	Andy Mooradian	1	4–12	.250
11	1951–1952	Dale Hall	1	11–9	.550
12	1952–1956	Bob Kerr	4	22–49	.310
13	1956–1966	Bill Olson	10	60–166	.265
14	1966–1969	Bill Haubrich	3	20–49	.290
15	1969–1989	Gerry Friel	20	185–335	.356
16	1989–1992	Jim Boylan	3	15–69	.179
17	1992–1996	Gib Chapman	4	46–64	.418
18	1996–1999	Jeff Jackson	3	21–60	.259
19	1999–2005	Phil Rowe	6	45–125	.265
20	2005–2023	Bill Herrion	18	227–303	.428
Totals		20 coaches	118 seasons	978–1,531	.390
Records updated through end of 2022–23 season Source
