= List of Florida State Seminoles men's basketball head coaches =

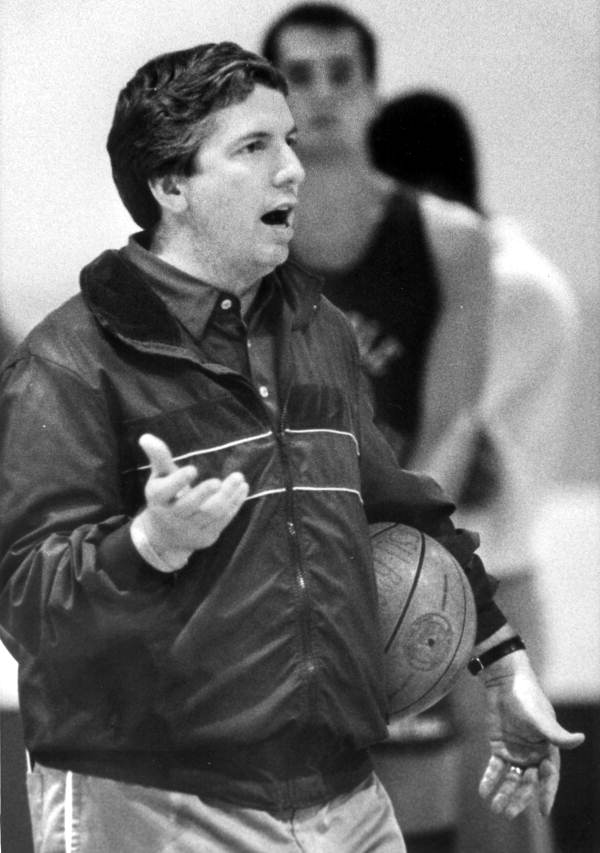
Pat Kennedy coached the Seminoles to an Elite Eight appearance in 1993.

The following is a list of Florida State Seminoles men's basketball head coaches. There have been eight head coaches of the Seminoles in their 80-season history.

Florida State's current head coach is Luke Loucks, who was hired as the Seminoles' head coach prior to the 2025–26 season.

No.	Tenure	Coach	Years	Record	Pct.
1	1947–1948	Don Loucks	1	5–13	.278
2	1948–1966	J. K. Kennedy	18	234–208	.529
3	1966–1978	Hugh Durham	12	229–96	.705
4	1978–1986	Joe Williams	8	129–105	.551
5	1986–1997	Pat Kennedy	11	202–131	.607
6	1997–2002	Steve Robinson	5	64–86	.427
7	2002–2025 (Note: Florida State vacated 22 wins from the 2006–07 seasons. Hamilton's on-court record is 460–296 (.608).)	Leonard Hamilton	23	438–296	.597
8	2025–present	Luke Loucks	2	23–16	.590
Totals		8 coaches	81 seasons	1,324–951	.582
Records updated through end of 2024–25 season Source
