= Bill Olson =

Bill Olson may refer to:

- Willis S. Olson, American ski jumper
- Bill Olson (coach), American college sports coach
- Billy Olson, American Olympic pole vaulter
- William Olson, American farmer and politician.
