= 1965–66 Kentucky Wildcats men's basketball team =

1965–66 season of University of Kentucky men's basketball team

1965–66 Kentucky Wildcats men's basketball

SEC champions NCAA regular season champions NCAA tournament, runner-up

National Championship Game, L 65-72 vs. Texas Western
- Conference: Southeastern Conference

Ranking
- Coaches: No. 1
- AP: No. 1
- Record: 27–2 (15–1 SEC)
- Head coach: Adolph Rupp (36th season)
- Assistant coach: Harry Lancaster (21st season)
- Home arena: Memorial Coliseum

The 1965–66 Kentucky Wildcats men's basketball team represented the University of Kentucky in NCAA competition in the 1965–66 season. Coached by Adolph Rupp, the team had no player taller than 6 ft 5 in (1.96 m)—unusually small even for that era—and became known as "Rupp's Runts". The Wildcats were members of the Southeastern Conference (SEC), and played their home games at Memorial Coliseum, their home until Rupp Arena opened in 1976.

Led on the floor by future Hall of Fame coach Pat Riley and Louie Dampier, the Cats reached the top ranking in all major polls entering the NCAA tournament; their only regular-season loss was at Tennessee. They ultimately lost in the final 72–65 to Texas Western (now UTEP), a team that was inducted in its entirety to the Hall of Fame. The game is mostly remembered for its sociological subtext—the Miners were the first major college team to start five black players in an NCAA Final (having done so for virtually all of the 1965–66 season), while the Wildcats were all-white (until 1969).

== Roster ==
1965–66 Kentucky Wildcats men's basketball team
Players
Coaches

Pos.	#	Name	Height	Weight	Year	Hometown
G	10	Louie Dampier	6 ft 0 in (1.83 m)	—	Jr	Indianapolis, IN
G	12	Jim LeMaster	6 ft 2 in (1.88 m)	—	So	Paris, KY
F	22	Gene Stewart	6 ft 2 in (1.88 m)	—	Jr	Brookville, IN
G	24	Bob Tallent	6 ft 1 in (1.85 m)	—	So	Langley, KY
F	25	Tom Porter	6 ft 3 in (1.91 m)	—	So	Gracey, KY
G	30	Tommy Kron	6 ft 5 in (1.96 m)	—	Sr	Tell City, IN
G	32	Steve Clevenger	6 ft 0 in (1.83 m)	—	So	Anderson, IN
F	40	Larry Conley	6 ft 3 in (1.91 m)	—	Sr	Ashland, KY
G	42	Pat Riley	6 ft 4 in (1.93 m)	—	Jr	Schenectady, NY
F	44	Brad Bounds	6 ft 6 in (1.98 m)	—	Jr	Bluffton, IN
C	45	Cliff Berger	6 ft 8 in (2.03 m)	—	So	Centralia, IL
F	50	Gary Gamble	6 ft 4 in (1.93 m)	—	So	Earlington, KY
C	54	Larry Lentz	6 ft 8 in (2.03 m)	—	Sr	Lakeview, OH
F	55	Thad Jaracz	6 ft 5 in (1.96 m)	—	So	Lexington, KY
F		Bob Windsor	6 ft 4 in (1.93 m)	—	Jr	Silver Spring, MD

Head coach

- Adolph Rupp (Kansas)

Assistant coach(es)

- Harry Lancaster (Georgetown College)

Legend

- (C) Team captain
- (S) Suspended
- (I) Ineligible
- (W) Walk-on
- Injured
- Current redshirt

== Schedule ==
Date time, TV	Rank^{#}	Opponent^{#}	Result	Record	Site city, state
Regular Season
December 1, 1965*		Hardin-Simmons	W 83–55	1–0	Memorial Coliseum; Lexington, KY
December 4, 1965*		Virginia	W 99–73	2–0	University Hall; Charlottesville, VA
December 8, 1965*		Illinois	W 86–68	3–0	Assembly Hall; Champaign, IL
December 11, 1965*		Northwestern	W 86–75	4–0	Memorial Coliseum; Lexington, KY
December 17, 1965*		Air Force	W 78–58	5–0	Memorial Coliseum; Lexington, KY
December 18, 1965*		Indiana	W 91–56	6–0	Memorial Coliseum; Lexington, KY
December 22, 1965*	No. 10	Texas Tech	W 89–73	7–0	Lubbock Municipal Coliseum; Lubbock, TX
December 29, 1965*	No. 5	Notre Dame	W 103–69	8–0	Freedom Hall; Louisville, KY
January 3, 1966*	No. 2	Saint Louis	W 80–70	9–0	Memorial Coliseum; Lexington, KY
January 8, 1966	No. 2	Florida; Rivalry	W 78–64	10–0 (1–0)	Florida Gymnasium; Gainesville, FL
January 10, 1966	No. 2	Georgia	W 69–65 ^{2OT}	11–0 (2–0)	Stegeman Coliseum; Athens, GA
January 15, 1966	No. 2	No. 3 Vanderbilt	W 96–83	12–0 (3–0)	Memorial Coliseum; Lexington, KY
January 24, 1966	No. 2	LSU	W 111–85	13–0 (4–0)	Memorial Coliseum; Lexington, KY
January 29, 1966	No. 2	Auburn	W 115–78	14–0 (5–0)	Memorial Coliseum; Lexington, KY
January 31, 1966	No. 2	Alabama	W 82–62	15–0 (6–0)	Memorial Coliseum; Lexington, KY
February 2, 1966	No. 2	No. 3 Vanderbilt	W 105–90	16–0 (7–0)	Memorial Gymnasium; Nashville, TN
February 5, 1966	No. 2	Georgia	W 74–50	17–0 (8–0)	Memorial Coliseum; Lexington, KY
February 7, 1966	No. 1	Florida; Rivalry	W 85–75	18–0 (9–0)	Memorial Coliseum; Lexington, KY
February 12, 1966	No. 1	Auburn	W 77–64	19–0 (10–0)	Auburn Sports Arena; Auburn, AL
February 14, 1966	No. 1	Alabama	W 90–67	20–0 (11–0)	Foster Auditorium; Tuscaloosa, AL
February 19, 1966	No. 1	Mississippi State	W 73–69	21–0 (12–0)	McCarthy Gymnasium; Starkville, MS
February 21, 1966	No. 1	Ole Miss	W 108–65	22–0 (13–0)	Gymnasium; Oxford, MS
February 26, 1966	No. 1	Tennessee; Rivalry	W 78–64	23–0 (14–0)	Memorial Coliseum; Lexington, KY
March 5, 1966	No. 1	Tennessee; Rivalry	L 62–69	23–1 (14–1)	Armory-Fieldhouse; Knoxville, TN
March 7, 1966	No. 1	Tulane	W 103–74	24–1 (15–1)	Memorial Coliseum; Lexington, KY
NCAA Tournament
March 11, 1966*	No. 1	vs. Dayton; Regional semifinal	W 86–79	25–1	Iowa Field House; Iowa City, IA
March 12, 1966*	No. 1	vs. No. 9 Michigan; Elite Eight	W 81–80	26–1	Iowa Field House; Iowa City, Iowa
March 18, 1966*	No. 1	vs. No. 2 Duke; National semifinal	W 83–79	27–1	Cole Field House; College Park, MD
March 19, 1966*	No. 1	vs. No. 3 Texas Western; National Championship	L 65–72	27–2	Cole Field House; College Park, MD
*Non-conference game. ^{#}Rankings from AP Poll. (#) Tournament seedings in parentheses. All times are in Eastern time.

== Awards and honors ==
1966 SEC co-Player of the Year: Pat Riley
1966 Consensus All-American: Louie Dampier (Second Team)
1966 All-SEC: Pat Riley, Louie Dampier (First Team); Thad Jaracz (Second Team)

== Team players in the 1966 NBA draft ==
Round	Pick	Player	NBA club
3	24	Tommy Kron	St. Louis Hawks
