= 1965–66 Houston Cougars men's basketball team =

American college basketball season

1965–66 Houston Cougars men's basketball
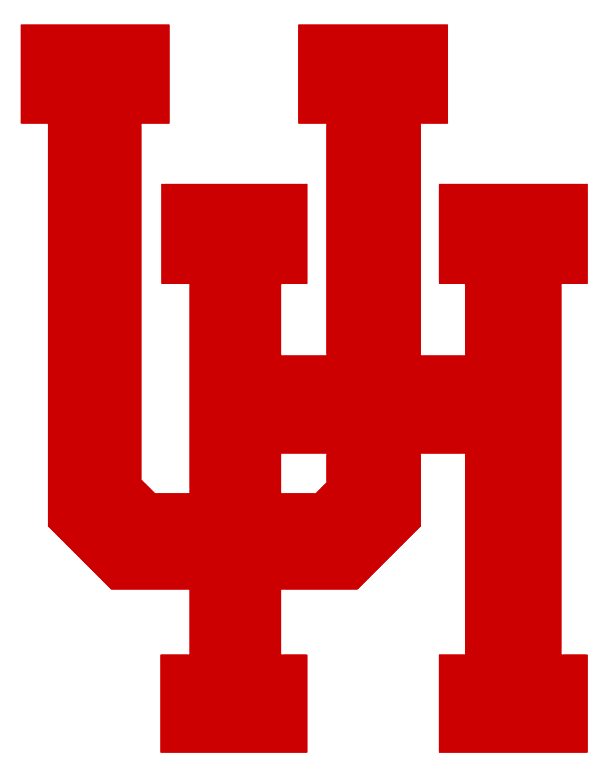

NCAA tournament, Regional Semifinals
- Conference: Independent

Ranking
- Coaches: No. 14
- Record: 23–6
- Head coach: Guy Lewis (10th season)
- Assistant coach: Harvey Pate
- Home arena: Jeppesen Fieldhouse; Delmar Fieldhouse; Sam Houston Coliseum

1965–66 NCAA University Division men's basketball independents standings
	Conf.				Overall
Team	W		L	PCT	W		L	PCT
No. 3 Texas Western		–		–	28	–	1	.966
No. 6 Loyola Chicago		–		–	22	–	3	.880
Oklahoma City		–		–	24	–	5	.828
Providence		–		–	22	–	5	.815
Boston College		–		–	21	–	5	.808
Dayton		–		–	23	–	6	.793
Houston		–		–	23	–	6	.793
Fairfield		–		–	19	–	5	.792
VPI		–		–	19	–	5	.792
Syracuse		–		–	22	–	6	.786
Hardin–Simmons		–		–	20	–	6	.769
Penn State		–		–	18	–	6	.750
Rutgers		–		–	17	–	7	.708
St. Bonaventure		–		–	16	–	7	.696
Army		–		–	18	–	8	.692
DePaul		–		–	18	–	8	.692
St. John's		–		–	18	–	8	.692
Detroit		–		–	17	–	8	.680
Georgetown		–		–	16	–	8	.667
Colorado State		–		–	14	–	8	.636
Villanova		–		–	18	–	11	.621
Butler		–		–	16	–	10	.615
Seattle		–		–	16	–	10	.615
Duquesne		–		–	14	–	9	.609
Miami (FL)		–		–	15	–	11	.577
Denver		–		–	14	–	11	.560
Florida State		–		–	14	–	11	.560
Air Force		–		–	14	–	12	.538
Creighton		–		–	14	–	12	.538
Marquette		–		–	14	–	12	.538
Georgia Tech		–		–	13	–	13	.500
Xavier		–		–	13	–	13	.500
Loyola (LA)		–		–	12	–	12	.500
Centenary		–		–	12	–	14	.462
Utah State		–		–	12	–	14	.462
Niagara		–		–	11	–	13	.458
Holy Cross		–		–	10	–	13	.435
Fordham		–		–	10	–	15	.400
Memphis State		–		–	10	–	15	.400
Navy		–		–	7	–	12	.368
Colgate		–		–	8	–	14	.364
Canisius		–		–	7	–	15	.318
Saint Francis (PA)		–		–	8	–	18	.308
West Texas State		–		–	6	–	17	.261
Portland		–		–	6	–	19	.240
Pittsburgh		–		–	5	–	17	.227
Notre Dame		–		–	5	–	21	.192
Boston University		–		–	4	–	19	.174
New Mexico State		–		–	4	–	22	.154
Rankings from AP Poll

The 1965–66 Houston Cougars men's basketball team represented the University of Houston in NCAA University Division competition in the 1965–66 season.

Houston, coached by Guy Lewis, played its home games in Jeppesen Fieldhouse, Delmar Fieldhouse, and the Sam Houston Coliseum in Houston, Texas, and was then an Independent.

== Roster ==
1965–66 Houston Cougars men's basketball team
Players
Coaches

Pos.	#	Name	Height	Weight	Year	Hometown
G	12	Gary Grider	6 ft 1 in (1.85 m)	175 lb (79 kg)	Jr	Washington, Indiana
G	20	David Starks	5 ft 10 in (1.78 m)	170 lb (77 kg)	Jr	Buffalo, Kentucky
G	22	Joe Hamood	6 ft 0 in (1.83 m)	180 lb (82 kg)	Sr	Dearborn, Michigan
G	24	Don Chaney	6 ft 5 in (1.96 m)	210 lb (95 kg)	So	Baton Rouge, Louisiana
F	30	Leary Lentz	6 ft 6 in (1.98 m)	200 lb (91 kg)	Jr	Clarkton, Missouri
G	32	Elliott McVey	5 ft 10 in (1.78 m)	170 lb (77 kg)	So	Yellville, Arkansas
F	42	Don Kruse	6 ft 8 in (2.03 m)	235 lb (107 kg)	Jr	Simms, Texas
F	44	Elvin Hayes	6 ft 8 in (2.03 m)	235 lb (107 kg)	So	Rayville, Louisiana

Head coach

- Guy Lewis (Houston)

Assistant coach(es)

- Harvey Pate (Oklahoma State)

Legend

- (C) Team captain
- (S) Suspended
- (I) Ineligible
- (W) Walk-on
- Injured
- Current redshirt

Roster

== Schedule and results ==
Date time, TV	Opponent	Result	Record	Site city, state
Regular season
Dec 1, 1965	at San Francisco	L 67–75	0–1	War Memorial Gymnasium; San Francisco, California
Dec 4, 1965	at BYU	L 82–111	0–2	Smith Fieldhouse; Provo, Utah
Dec 9, 1965	at Texas A&M	L 88–93	0–3	G. Rollie White Coliseum; College Station, Texas
Dec 11, 1965	Wisconsin	W 82–57	1–3	Sam Houston Coliseum; Houston, Texas
Dec 15, 1965	vs. LSU; Bluebonnet Classic	W 111–87	2–3	Rice Gymnasium; Houston, Texas
Dec 16, 1965	vs. Texas A&M; Bluebonnet Classic	W 90–85	3–3	Rice Gymnasium; Houston, Texas
Dec 18, 1965	at TCU	W 132–102	4–3	Daniel-Meyer Coliseum; Fort Worth, Texas
Dec 20, 1965	No. 7 Providence	W 102–89	5–3	Delmar Fieldhouse; Houston, Texas
Dec 29, 1965	vs. Maryland; Sugar Bowl Classic	L 68–69	5–4	Tulane Stadium; New Orleans, Louisiana
Dec 30, 1965	vs. Auburn; Sugar Bowl Classic	W 89–76	6–4	Tulane Stadium; New Orleans, Louisiana
Jan 8, 1966	Trinity (TX)	W 95–52	7–4	Jeppesen Fieldhouse; Houston, Texas
Jan 13, 1966	at Centenary (LA)	W 108–84	8–4	Haynes Gymnasium; Shreveport, Louisiana
Jan 15, 1966	at Tulsa	W 72–71	9–4	Tulsa Fairgrounds Pavilion; Tulsa, Oklahoma
Jan 17, 1966	St. Mary's	W 109–53	10–4	Jeppesen Fieldhouse; Houston, Texas
Jan 26, 1966	Baylor	W 92–91 ^{OT}	11–4	Delmar Fieldhouse; Houston, Texas
Jan 27, 1966	TCU	W 100–79	12–4	Delmar Fieldhouse; Houston, Texas
Jan 28, 1966	Texas A&M	W 97–85	13–4	Delmar Fieldhouse; Houston, Texas
Feb 2, 1966	Lamar Tech	W 112–84	14–4	Jeppesen Fieldhouse; Houston, Texas
Feb 5, 1966	Tulsa	W 97–77	15–4	Delmar Fieldhouse; Houston, Texas
Feb 7, 1966	Centenary (LA)	W 125–96	16–4	Jeppesen Fieldhouse; Houston, Texas
Feb 12, 1966	Southwestern	W 140–87	17–4	Jeppesen Fieldhouse; Houston, Texas
Feb 17, 1966	Miami (FL)	W 111–96	18–4	Delmar Fieldhouse; Houston, Texas
Feb 22, 1966	Texas Wesleyan	W 152–108	19–4	Jeppesen Fieldhouse; Houston, Texas
Feb 24, 1966	vs. Dayton	L 69–71	19–5	Madison Square Garden; New York City, New York
Feb 26, 1966	Portland	W 109–84	20–5	Jeppesen Fieldhouse; Houston, Texas
Mar 1, 1966	at Loyola (LA)	W 103–77	21–5	Loyola Field House; New Orleans, Louisiana
NCAA tournament
Mar 7, 1966	vs. Colorado State; Regional quarterfinals – First round	W 82–76	22–5	WSU Field House; Wichita, Kansas
Mar 11, 1966	vs. Oregon State; Regional semifinals – Sweet Sixteen	L 60–63	22–6	Pauley Pavilion; Los Angeles, California
Mar 12, 1966	vs. Pacific; Regional third-place game	W 102–91	23–6	Pauley Pavilion; Los Angeles, California
*Non-conference game. ^{#}Rankings from AP Poll. (#) Tournament seedings in parentheses. All times are in Central Time.

== Rankings ==
Ranking movements Legend: ██ Increase in ranking ██ Decrease in ranking — = Not ranked
	Week															
Poll	Pre	1	2	3	4	5	6	7	8	9	10	11	12	13	14	Final
AP	—	—	—	—	—	—	—	—	—	—	—	—	—	—	—	—
Coaches	—	—	—	—	—	—	—	—	—	—	—	—	16	15	—	14
