= Morris McHone =

American basketball coach

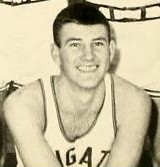
- McHone in 1963 as a member of Wingate College's men's basketball team

Personal information
- Born: June 17, 1943 (age 83) Marion, North Carolina, U.S.

Career information
- High school: Marion (Marion, North Carolina)
- College: Wingate (1961–1963)

Career history

Coaching
- 1969–1978: Florida State (assistant)
- 1978–1979: Georgia (assistant)
- 1979–1980: Cleveland Cavaliers (assistant)
- 1980–1983: San Antonio Spurs (assistant)
- 1983: San Antonio Spurs
- 1984–1986: Cleveland Cavaliers (assistant)
- 1986–1991: Bradley (assistant)
- 1991–1992: Birmingham Bandits
- 1992–1993: Fort Wayne Fury
- 1993–1995: Yakima Sun Kings
- 1995–1999: Sioux Falls Skyforce
- 1999–2001: Detroit Pistons (assistant)
- 2001–2003: Los Angeles Clippers (assistant)
- 2006–2007, 2010–2012: Sioux Falls Skyforce

Career highlights
- As head coach: 2× CBA champion (1995, 1996)

Morris Daniel "Mo" McHone (born June 17, 1943) is an American former professional basketball coach. He was the head coach for the San Antonio Spurs of the National Basketball Association (NBA) in 1983 and served as an assistant for the Cleveland Cavaliers, Detroit Pistons, Los Angeles Clippers. McHone also coached in the Continental Basketball Association (CBA) and NBA Development League.

== Early life and playing career ==
McHone was born to parents who were mill workers: his father was a machinist and his mother was a cloth inspector. He attended Marion High School in his hometown of Marion, North Carolina. McHone received no college offers after his graduation and participated in an open basketball tryout at Wingate College (now Wingate University). He was drawn to the college because it was affiliated with the Baptist State Convention of North Carolina and his mother was a Southern Baptist. McHone impressed Wingate head coach, Bill Connell, and was invited to enrol at the college. He had been promised a scholarship by Connell if he made the team but McHone received limited playing time and did not receive a scholarship.

== Coaching career ==
=== College ===
McHone joined the Florida State Seminoles as a student manager during the 1963–64 season. Seminoles head coach, J. K. Kennedy, was suffering from cancer and relegated much of his responsibilities to his assistant, Hugh Durham, who in turn assigned opposition scouting duties to McHone. McHone considered the position as being that of an honorary assistant coach. He suggested that the Seminoles baseball team recruit his former Wingate basketball teammate, Mike Martin, who joined the program in 1965 and later returned to serve as the Seminoles head coach for 40 years.

McHone graduated from Florida State University and spent three seasons as a head coach of the varsity basketball team at a high school in Florida. Durham brought McHone back to the Seminoles as an assistant in 1969. McHone recruited Sleepy Floyd to join the Seminoles in 1978 but Durham left to coach for the Georgia Bulldogs and Floyd changed his commitment. McHone followed Durham to the Bulldogs and the two recruited Dominique Wilkins.

=== National Basketball Association (NBA) ===
In 1979, McHone received an offer to join the Cleveland Cavaliers of the National Basketball Association (NBA) as an assistant coach. Incoming Cavaliers head coach, Stan Albeck, wanted an assistant from the collegiate ranks and had his agent invite McHone. After one season with the Cavaliers, Albeck was hired as head coach of the San Antonio Spurs and McHone joined him there. Albeck left the Spurs in 1983 to become head coach of the New Jersey Nets and McHone was appointed as the Spurs head coach. The Spurs had an aging roster led by George Gervin and Artis Gilmore and McHone believed that he was not ready for a professional head coaching role. The Spurs accumulated an 11–20 record under McHone until he was fired on December 28, 1983.

On September 5, 1984, McHone was announced as an assistant coach for the Cleveland Cavaliers under head coach George Karl. He resigned from the position in February 1986. McHone reunited with Albeck on the coaching staff of the Bradley Braves in 1986 and served alongside him until 1991.

McHone also served as an assistant coach for the Detroit Pistons (1999–2001) and Los Angeles Clippers (2001–2003).

=== Continental Basketball Association (CBA) and NBA Development League ===
McHone has coached in the Continental Basketball Association (CBA) and won two championships. He was the head coach for the Birmingham Bandits in the 1991–92 season, Fort Wayne Fury in the 1992–93 season, Yakima Sun Kings from 1993 to 1995, and Sioux Falls Skyforce from 1995 to 1999. McHone returned to serve as head coach for the Skyforce during the 2006–07 season and from 2010 to 2012 when they were in the NBA Development League. McHone owns the Skyforce franchise record for all-time wins with 195 and was inducted into the Skyforce Hall of Fame in 2016. He won CBA championships with the Sun Kings in 1995 and Skyforce in 1996.

In between his time with the Skyforce, McHone was named Director of Basketball Development for the Austin Toros of the NBA Development League.

=== National team ===
McHone has served as head coach of the United States men's national basketball team for several stints.

== Head coaching record ==
Legend
Regular season	G	Games coached	W	Games won	L	Games lost	W–L %	Win–loss %
Playoffs	PG	Playoff games	PW	Playoff wins	PL	Playoff losses	PW–L %	Playoff win–loss %

Team	Year	G	W	L	W–L%	Finish	PG	PW	PL	PW–L%	Result
San Antonio	1983–84	31	11	20	.355	(fired)	—	—	—	—	Missed playoffs
