= 1965–66 St. John's Redmen basketball team =

American college basketball season

1965–66 St. John's Redmen men's basketball

1966 NIT, First Round
- Conference: Independent
- Record: 18–8
- Head coach: Lou Carnesecca (1st season)
- Assistant coach: John Kresse
- Captain: Bob McIntyre
- Home arena: Alumni Hall; Madison Square Garden

1965–66 NCAA University Division men's basketball independents standings
	Conf.				Overall
Team	W		L	PCT	W		L	PCT
No. 3 Texas Western		–		–	28	–	1	.966
No. 6 Loyola Chicago		–		–	22	–	3	.880
Oklahoma City		–		–	24	–	5	.828
Providence		–		–	22	–	5	.815
Boston College		–		–	21	–	5	.808
Dayton		–		–	23	–	6	.793
Houston		–		–	23	–	6	.793
Fairfield		–		–	19	–	5	.792
VPI		–		–	19	–	5	.792
Syracuse		–		–	22	–	6	.786
Hardin–Simmons		–		–	20	–	6	.769
Penn State		–		–	18	–	6	.750
Rutgers		–		–	17	–	7	.708
St. Bonaventure		–		–	16	–	7	.696
Army		–		–	18	–	8	.692
DePaul		–		–	18	–	8	.692
St. John's		–		–	18	–	8	.692
Detroit		–		–	17	–	8	.680
Georgetown		–		–	16	–	8	.667
Colorado State		–		–	14	–	8	.636
Villanova		–		–	18	–	11	.621
Butler		–		–	16	–	10	.615
Seattle		–		–	16	–	10	.615
Duquesne		–		–	14	–	9	.609
Miami (FL)		–		–	15	–	11	.577
Denver		–		–	14	–	11	.560
Florida State		–		–	14	–	11	.560
Air Force		–		–	14	–	12	.538
Creighton		–		–	14	–	12	.538
Marquette		–		–	14	–	12	.538
Georgia Tech		–		–	13	–	13	.500
Xavier		–		–	13	–	13	.500
Loyola (LA)		–		–	12	–	12	.500
Centenary		–		–	12	–	14	.462
Utah State		–		–	12	–	14	.462
Niagara		–		–	11	–	13	.458
Holy Cross		–		–	10	–	13	.435
Fordham		–		–	10	–	15	.400
Memphis State		–		–	10	–	15	.400
Navy		–		–	7	–	12	.368
Colgate		–		–	8	–	14	.364
Canisius		–		–	7	–	15	.318
Saint Francis (PA)		–		–	8	–	18	.308
West Texas State		–		–	6	–	17	.261
Portland		–		–	6	–	19	.240
Pittsburgh		–		–	5	–	17	.227
Notre Dame		–		–	5	–	21	.192
Boston University		–		–	4	–	19	.174
New Mexico State		–		–	4	–	22	.154
Rankings from AP Poll

The 1965–66 St. John's Redmen basketball team represented St. John's University during the 1965–66 NCAA Division I men's basketball season. The team was coached by Lou Carnesecca in his first year at the school after Joe Lapchick's retirement. St. John's home games were played at Alumni Hall and Madison Square Garden.

== Roster ==
#	Name	Height	Position	Class	Hometown	Previous School(s)
4	Al Swartz	5'10"	G	JR	Uniondale, NY	Chaminade HS
10	Brian Hill	5'11"	G	JR	Ridgewood, NY	St. Francis Prep
11	Kit Frey	6'9"	F/C	SO	Barryville, NY	Eldred Central HS
12	Jack Brunner	6'4"	G/F	JR	Guttenberg, NJ	Memorial HS
14	Rudy Bogad	6'7"	F	SO	New York, NY	Archbishop Molloy HS
15	William Jones	6'4"	G	JR	Bronx, NY	Manhattan Prep
21	Bob Duerr	6'2"	G	SR	Canton, OH	N/A
24	Jack Bettridge	6'2"	G	SO	North Bergen, NJ	Power Memorial HS
25	Daniel Mascia	6'4"	G/F	SR	Brooklyn, NY	Thomas Jefferson HS
35	Hank Cluess	6'6"	F	SR	Queens, NY	Archbishop Molloy HS
44	Bob McIntyre	6'6"	F	SR	Queens, NY	Holy Cross HS
55	Lloyd "Sonny" Dove	6'8"	F	JR	Brooklyn, NY	St. Francis Prep
	Mike Rowland	6'4"	G	SO	Ozone Park, NY	Bishop Loughlin HS

== Schedule and results ==
Date time, TV	Rank^{#}	Opponent^{#}	Result	Record	Site city, state
Regular Season
12/04/65*		at Georgetown	W 64-62 ^{OT}	1-0	McDonough Gymnasium; Washington, D.C.
12/07/65*		George Washington	W 100-62	2-0	Alumni Hall; Queens, NY
12/10/65*		vs. Kansas State; Sunflower Doubleheader	W 72-65	3-0	Allen Fieldhouse; Lawrence, KS
12/11/65*		vs. No. 7 Kansas; Sunflower Doubleheader	L 55-61	3-1	Ahearn Fieldhouse; Manhattan, KS
12/15/65*		Canisius	W 85-65	4-1	Alumni Hall; Queens, NY
12/18/65*		Seton Hall	W 75-64	5-1	Alumni Hall; Queens, NY
12/27/65*		vs. Purdue; L.A. Classic	L 75-77	5-2	LA Sports Arena; Los Angeles, CA
12/29/65*		vs. Louisiana State; L.A. Classic	W 102-60	6-2	LA Sports Arena; Los Angeles, CA
12/30/65*		vs. Syracuse; L.A. Classic	L 97-113	6-3	LA Sports Arena; Los Angeles, CA
01/08/66*		Villanova	W 68-63 ^{OT}	7-3	Alumni Hall; Queens, NY
01/12/66*		Syracuse	W 66-65	8-3	Alumni Hall; Queens, NY
01/15/66*		St. Francis (NY)	W 92-66	9-3	Alumni Hall; Queens, NY
01/19/66*		No. 3 St. Joseph's	W 82-72	10-3	Alumni Hall; Queens, NY
01/29/66*		at Pittsburgh	W 74-51	11-3	Fitzgerald Field House; Pittsburgh, PA
01/31/66*		at West Virginia	L 72-73	11-4	Stansbury Hall; Morgantown, WV
02/05/66*		at Niagara	W 85-69	12-4	NU Student Center; Lewiston, NY
02/09/66*		at Temple	W 75-72	13-4	The Palestra; Philadelphia, PA
02/12/66*		Army	W 53-51	14-4	Alumni Hall; Queens, NY
02/14/66*		at Creighton	L 67-86	14-5	Omaha Civic Auditorium; Omaha, NE
02/15/66*		at Notre Dame	W 77-59	15-5	Notre Dame Fieldhouse; Notre Dame, IN
02/19/66*		Fordham	W 74-72	16-5	Alumni Hall; Queens, NY
02/22/66*		at Massachusetts	W 80-73	17-5	Curry Hicks Cage; Amherst, MA
02/26/66*		Marquette	W 70-68	18-5	Alumni Hall; Queens, NY
03/01/66*		Holy Cross	L 60-63	18-6	Alumni Hall; Queens, NY
03/05/66*		NYU	L 58-67	18-7	Alumni Hall; Queens, NY
NIT
03/12/66*		vs. Villanova; NIT First Round	L 61-63	18-8	Madison Square Garden; New York, NY
*Non-conference game. ^{#}Rankings from AP Poll. (#) Tournament seedings in parentheses.
