= 1965–66 Georgetown Hoyas men's basketball team =

American college basketball season

1965–66 Georgetown Hoyas men's basketball
- Conference: Independent
- Record: 16–8
- Head coach: Tommy O'Keefe (6th season)
- Assistant coach: Chuck Devlin (2nd season)
- Captain: Jim Brown
- Home arena: McDonough Gymnasium

1965–66 NCAA University Division men's basketball independents standings
	Conf.				Overall
Team	W		L	PCT	W		L	PCT
No. 3 Texas Western		–		–	28	–	1	.966
No. 6 Loyola Chicago		–		–	22	–	3	.880
Oklahoma City		–		–	24	–	5	.828
Providence		–		–	22	–	5	.815
Boston College		–		–	21	–	5	.808
Dayton		–		–	23	–	6	.793
Houston		–		–	23	–	6	.793
Fairfield		–		–	19	–	5	.792
VPI		–		–	19	–	5	.792
Syracuse		–		–	22	–	6	.786
Hardin–Simmons		–		–	20	–	6	.769
Penn State		–		–	18	–	6	.750
Rutgers		–		–	17	–	7	.708
St. Bonaventure		–		–	16	–	7	.696
Army		–		–	18	–	8	.692
DePaul		–		–	18	–	8	.692
St. John's		–		–	18	–	8	.692
Detroit		–		–	17	–	8	.680
Georgetown		–		–	16	–	8	.667
Colorado State		–		–	14	–	8	.636
Villanova		–		–	18	–	11	.621
Butler		–		–	16	–	10	.615
Seattle		–		–	16	–	10	.615
Duquesne		–		–	14	–	9	.609
Miami (FL)		–		–	15	–	11	.577
Denver		–		–	14	–	11	.560
Florida State		–		–	14	–	11	.560
Air Force		–		–	14	–	12	.538
Creighton		–		–	14	–	12	.538
Marquette		–		–	14	–	12	.538
Georgia Tech		–		–	13	–	13	.500
Xavier		–		–	13	–	13	.500
Loyola (LA)		–		–	12	–	12	.500
Centenary		–		–	12	–	14	.462
Utah State		–		–	12	–	14	.462
Niagara		–		–	11	–	13	.458
Holy Cross		–		–	10	–	13	.435
Fordham		–		–	10	–	15	.400
Memphis State		–		–	10	–	15	.400
Navy		–		–	7	–	12	.368
Colgate		–		–	8	–	14	.364
Canisius		–		–	7	–	15	.318
Saint Francis (PA)		–		–	8	–	18	.308
West Texas State		–		–	6	–	17	.261
Portland		–		–	6	–	19	.240
Pittsburgh		–		–	5	–	17	.227
Notre Dame		–		–	5	–	21	.192
Boston University		–		–	4	–	19	.174
New Mexico State		–		–	4	–	22	.154
Rankings from AP Poll

The 1965–66 Georgetown Hoyas men's basketball team represented Georgetown University during the 1965–66 NCAA University Division college basketball season. Tommy O'Keefe coached it in his sixth and final season as head coach. The team was an independent and played its home games at McDonough Gymnasium on the Georgetown campus in Washington, D.C. It finished with a record of 16–8 and no postseason play.

== Season recap ==
In the previous season, Georgetown had started strong, raising hopes for a post-season tournament berth, but lost seven of its final 10 games to drop out of consideration for post-season play. This year, the Hoyas had a mediocre start, going 5–5 in their first ten games, but three of those losses came by a combined total of only six points. They began the new year of 1966 with eight straight wins by an average 17-point margin. During the streak, they had back-to-back 100-plus-point games with victories of 103-74 over George Washington and 104–73 over New York University (NYU). The winning streak pushed Georgetown's record to 13–5, and hopes of a post-season tournament berth were high.

Senior guard Jim Brown was a talented point guard who led the 1965–66 team to an average of 83.8 points scored per game, a Georgetown record that still stands. Brown scored in double figures in 17 of the season's 24 games and led the team in scoring in four games. He shot 84% from the free-throw line, and had school records with 177 assists and 7.38 assists per game; the assists record stood for 14 years, and the assists-per-game record still stands.

Junior forward Steve Sullivan led the team in scoring and averaged 9.7 rebounds per game. He scored 30 points against Boston College, had 27 points and 18 rebounds against Fordham, and put in a 25-point performance in the Navy game.

Sophomore guard Dennis Cesar, a free-throw-shooting expert, joined the varsity team after a successful year on the freshman team the previous season. As a reserve, he came off the bench to score 21 points against Loyola early in the season. He became a starter in January 1966, and his per-game scoring average rose after that to 13.3 points. During the eight-game winning streak, he scored a combined 47 points in the two games against George Washington. Two of his free throws were key to Georgetown's upset of Rutgers, a big win in what turned out to the last game of the streak.

Sophomore guard Bruce Stinebrickner also arrived on the varsity after a year on the freshman team. He had turned down offers from 20 other schools, including Duke and Harvard, to attend Georgetown. He was an excellent defensive asset for the Hoyas, and also averaged 9.6 points per game.

Junior center Frank Hollendoner was limited by an eye injury and knee problems during the season. Nonetheless, he set a school record for points scored in a half by scoring 29 points in the first half against NYU. He finished the year averaging 11.4 points and 6.7 rebounds per game.

Senior forward Jim Barry – perhaps the greatest player of Georgetown men's basketball's "Classic Era" (1943–1972) – had missed the 1963–64 season while recovering from knee surgery. He had had a strong year in 1964–65, but knee problems returned to plague him this season. He played mostly as a reserve, but still averaged 11.7 points per game and had 22-point performances against both Loyola and Villanova. Senior forward John "Jake" Gibbons also played in a reserve role, but nonetheless averaged almost nine points and five rebounds a game and shot 48% from the field for the season.

The eight-game win streak ended when 13–5 Georgetown met eighth-ranked St. Joseph's (16–4) at the Palestra in Philadelphia, Pennsylvania. Both teams entered the game with postseason hopes, but the Hoyas had not beaten the Hawks since 1956, and they did not in this meeting; although St. Joseph's led by only three points midway through the first half, they pulled away rapidly from there, leading by 20 points at the half on the way to a 111–73 victory over the Hoyas. The lopsided loss effectively ended the Hoyas' hopes for a postseason tournament bid and halted their momentum, and they lost their next two games as well. They recovered to win their final three games, with a 20-point effort by Dennis Cesar against Seton Hall, 22 points including the winning shot in the final seconds by Gibbons against Fairfield, and back-to-back 28-point performances by Hollendoner in the final two games of the season against Fairfield and Canisius, giving them 11 wins in their last 14 games of the year. Although they won more games than any other Georgetown team had since the 1946–47 season, their 16–8 record – the best record of O'Keefe's six-year tenure as head coach – was not enough for them to receive an invitation to a post-season tournament in the wake of the blowout loss to St. Joseph's.

Although it had no post-season play, the class of 1966 finished with a record of 44-28 during its three varsity seasons combined. It was the first Georgetown class to post a winning record for its collegiate career since 1930.

Georgetown's head coaching position paid so little that O'Keefe could only serve as a part-time coach and held a full-time job outside of coaching in order to make ends meet, impairing his ability to recruit players. After the end of the season he resigned in order to devote himself full-time to his business concerns, prompting Georgetown to commit to hiring a full-time coach beginning with the following season. O'Keefe departed with a winning record (82–60) and no sub-.500 performances by the team, but also without the Hoyas having appeared in the post-season during his six years as head coach.

The team was not ranked in the Top 20 in the Associated Press Poll or Coaches' Poll at any time.

== Roster ==
From the 1958–59 season through the 1967–68 season, Georgetown players wore even-numbered jerseys for home games and odd-numbered ones for away games; for example, a player would wear No. 10 at home and No. 11 on the road. Players are listed below by the even numbers they wore at home.

#	Name	Height	Weight (lbs.)	Position	Class	Hometown	Previous Team(s)
4	Jim Barry	6"6"	195	F	Sr.	Elizabeth, NJ, U.S.	St. Peter's Preparatory School
10	Pete Mitchell	6"0"	N/A	G	Jr.	New Orleans, LA, U.S.	Jesuit HS
12	Bruce Stinebrickner	6'1"	180	G	So.	West Hempstead, NY, U.S.	St. Agnes Boys HS
14	Dennis Cesar	6'1"	180	G	So.	Clifton, NJ, U.S.	Clifton HS
20	Jim Lyddy	N/A	N/A	G	Jr.	Bridgeport, CT, U.S.	Fairfield College Preparatory School
22	Jim Brown	5"10"	170	G	Sr.	Ridgewood, NJ, U.S.	Don Bosco Preparatory HS
24	Steve Sullivan	6'8"	200	F	Jr.	East Orange, NJ, U.S.	Essex Catholic HS
32	Frank Hollendoner	6'11"	245	C	Jr.	Chicago, IL, U.S.	St. Patrick HS
40	Dave Philbin	6'4"	N/A	F	Sr.	Clinton, MA, U.S.	Portsmouth Priory School
42	John "Jake" Gibbons	6'5"	200	F/C	Sr.	Cambria Hills, NY, U.S.	Saint Francis HS
50	Bob Ward	6'7"	N/A	F	Jr.	Jersey City, NJ, U.S.	St. Peter's Preparatory School
54	Neil Heskin	6'9"	N/A	F/C	Jr.	Elizabeth, NJ, U.S.	St. Peter's Preparatory School

== 1965–66 schedule and results ==
Date time, TV	Rank^{#}	Opponent^{#}	Result	Record	Site city, state
Regular Season
Thu., Dec. 2, 1965 no, no		American	W 96–89	1-0	McDonough Gymnasium; Washington, DC
Sat., Dec. 4, 1965 no, no		St. John's	L 62–64	1-1	McDonough Gymnasium; Washington, DC
Tue., Dec. 7, 1965 no, no		Loyola Maryland	W 116–87	2-1	McDonough Gymnasium; Washington, DC
Sat., Dec. 11, 1965 no, no		at La Salle	W 101–99	3-1	Palestra; Philadelphia, PA
Wed., Dec. 15, 1965 no, no		at Maryland	L 59–77	3-2	Cole Field House; College Park, MD
Fri., Dec. 17, 1965 no, no		Columbia	W 97–79	4-2	McDonough Gymnasium; Washington, DC
Tue., Dec. 21, 1965 no, no		at Boston College	L 85–87	4-3	Roberts Center; Chestnut Hill, MA
Mon., Dec. 27, 1965 no, no		vs. Illinois; ECAC Holiday Festival	L 94–96	4-4	Madison Square Garden; New York, NY
Tue., Dec. 28, 1965 no, no		vs. New York University; ECAC Holiday Festival	W 88–87	5-4	Madison Square Garden; New York, NY
Thu., Dec. 30, 1965 no, no		vs. Villanova; ECAC Holiday Festival	L 72–81	5-5	Madison Square Garden; New York, NY
Wed., Jan. 5, 1966 no, no		at Navy	W 88–75	6-5	Halsey Field House; Annapolis, MD
Sat., Jan. 8, 1966 no, no		at Delaware	W 96–67	7-5	Delaware Field House; Newark, DE
Mon., Jan. 10, 1966 no, no		at George Washington	W 100–81	8-5	Fort Myer Gymnasium; Fort Myer, VA
Sat., Jan. 15, 1966 no, no		Fairleigh Dickinson	W 84–80	9-5	McDonough Gymnasium; Washington, DC
Sat., Jan. 29, 1966 no, no		at Fordham	W 81–79	10-5	Rose Hill Gymnasium; Bronx, NY
Thu., Feb. 3, 1966 no, no		George Washington	W 103–74	11-5	McDonough Gymnasium; Washington, DC
Sat., Feb. 5, 1966 no, no		New York University	W 104–73	12-5	McDonough Gymnasium; Washington, DC
Tue., Feb. 8, 1966 no, no		Rutgers	W 76–73	13-5	McDonough Gymnasium; Washington, DC
Fri., Feb. 11, 1966 no, no		at No. 8 St. Joseph's	L 73–111	13-6	Palestra; Philadelphia, PA
Sat., Feb. 12, 1966 no, no		Catholic	L 84–87	13-7	McDonough Gymnasium; Washington, DC
Thu., Feb. 17, 1966 no, no		at Manhattan	L 80–83	13-8	Madison Square Garden; New York, NY
Tue., Feb. 22, 1966 no, no		at Seton Hall	W 107–93	14-8	Walsh Gymnasium; South Orange, NJ
Sat., Feb. 26, 1966 no, no		Fairfield	W 77–75	15-8	McDonough Gymnasium; Washington, DC
Tue., Mar. 1, 1966 no, no		Canisius	W 83–69	16-8	McDonough Gymnasium; Washington, DC
*Non-conference game. ^{#}Rankings from AP Poll. (#) Tournament seedings in parentheses.
