= 1965–66 Indiana Hoosiers men's basketball team =

American college basketball season

1965–66 Indiana Hoosiers men's basketball
- Conference: Big Ten Conference
- Record: 8–16 (4–10 Big Ten)
- Head coach: Lou Watson (1st season)
- Assistant coaches: Don Luft; Tom Bolyard
- Captain: Gary Grieger
- Home arena: New Fieldhouse

1965–66 Big Ten Conference men's basketball standings
	Conf.				Overall
Team	W		L	PCT	W		L	PCT
No. 9 Michigan	11	–	3	.786	18	–	8	.692
Michigan State	10	–	4	.714	15	–	7	.682
Iowa	8	–	6	.571	17	–	7	.708
Illinois	8	–	6	.571	12	–	12	.500
Minnesota	7	–	7	.500	14	–	10	.583
Northwestern	7	–	7	.500	12	–	12	.500
Wisconsin	6	–	8	.429	11	–	13	.458
Ohio State	5	–	9	.357	11	–	13	.458
Indiana	4	–	10	.286	8	–	16	.333
Purdue	4	–	10	.286	8	–	16	.333
Rankings from AP Poll

The 1965–66 Indiana Hoosiers men's basketball team represented Indiana University. Their head coach was Lou Watson, who was in his 1st year. The team played its home games in New Fieldhouse in Bloomington, Indiana, and was a member of the Big Ten Conference.

The Hoosiers finished the regular season with an overall record of 8–16 and a conference record of 4–10, finishing 9th in the Big Ten Conference. Indiana was not invited to participate in any postseason tournament.

== Roster ==
No.	Name	Position	Ht.	Year	Hometown
22	Bill Russell	G	6–1	Jr.	Columbus, Indiana
23	Vern Payne	G	5–10	So.	Michigan City, Indiana
24	Vern Pfaff	G	5–10	Jr.	Ellettsville, Indiana
25	Ken Newsome	F	6–5	So.	Ahoskie, North Carolina
30	Rich Schrumpf	C	6–9	So.	Galien, Michigan
32	Frank Everett	C	6–6	So.	Williamston, North Carolina
33	Jack Johnson	F	6–6	Jr.	Greenfield, Indiana
34	Butch Joyner	F	6–4	So.	New Castle, Indiana
35	Ron McMains	F	6–5	Jr.	Frankfort, Indiana
40	Larry Turpen	G	6–1	Jr.	Shawswick, Indiana
41	Max Walker	G	6–1	Sr.	Milwaukee, Wisconsin
42	Erv Inniger	G	6–3	Jr.	Berne, Indiana
43	Gary Grieger	F	6–4	Sr.	Evansville, Indiana
45	Gary Leinberger	F	6–7	So.	St. Louis, Missouri

== Schedule/results ==
Date time, TV	Rank^{#}	Opponent^{#}	Result	Record	Site city, state
Regular season
12/1/1965*		St. Joseph's (Ind.)	W 76–62	1–0	New Fieldhouse; Bloomington, IN
12/4/1965*		at Oklahoma	L 82–83	1–1	McCasland Field House; Norman, OK
12/6/1965*		Detroit	L 75–78	1–2	New Fieldhouse; Bloomington, IN
12/13/1965*		Kansas State	L 69–82	1–3	New Fieldhouse; Bloomington, IN
12/17/1965*		vs. California; Kentucky Invitational	W 71–64	2–3	Memorial Coliseum; Lexington, KY
12/18/1965*		at Kentucky; Kentucky Invitational/Indiana–Kentucky rivalry	L 56–91	2–4	Memorial Coliseum; Lexington, KY
12/21/1965*		vs. Notre Dame	W 80–58	3–4	Memorial Coliseum; Fort Wayne, IN
12/31/1965*		vs. No. 3 Bradley	W 104–87	4–4	Chicago Stadium; Chicago, IL
1/3/1966*		Loyola (Chicago)	L 68–91	4–5	New Fieldhouse; Bloomington, IN
1/8/1966		Illinois; Rivalry	L 84–98	4–6 (0–1)	New Fieldhouse; Bloomington, IN
1/10/1966		at Michigan	L 68–88	4–7 (0–2)	Yost Field House; Ann Arbor, MI
1/15/1966		at Minnesota	L 82–91	4–8 (0–3)	Williams Arena; Minneapolis, MN
1/17/1966		Iowa	W 73–61	5–8 (1–3)	New Fieldhouse; Bloomington, IN
2/1/1966*		at DePaul	L 79–100	5–9 (1–3)	Alumni Hall; Chicago, IL
2/5/1966		No. 9 Michigan	L 76–93	5–10 (1–4)	New Fieldhouse; Bloomington, IN
2/7/1966		at Wisconsin	L 78–79	5–11 (1–5)	Wisconsin Field House; Madison, WI
2/12/1966		at Illinois; Rivalry	W 81–77	6–11 (2–5)	Assembly Hall; Champaign, IL
2/14/1966		Ohio State	W 81–61	7–11 (3–5)	St. John Arena; Columbus, OH
2/19/1966		Northwestern	L 82–83	7–12 (3–6)	New Fieldhouse; Bloomington, IN
2/21/1966		at Purdue; Rivalry	L 68–77	7–13 (3–7)	Lambert Fieldhouse; West Lafayette, IN
2/26/1966		at Michigan State	L 63–69	7–14 (3–8)	Jenison Fieldhouse; East Lansing, MI
2/28/1966		Minnesota	L 90–96	7–15 (3–9)	New Fieldhouse; Bloomington, IN
3/5/1966		Michigan State	W 86–76	8–15 (4–9)	New Fieldhouse; Bloomington, IN
3/7/1966		at Iowa	L 77–82	8–16 (4–10)	Iowa Field House; Iowa City, IA
*Non-conference game. ^{#}Rankings from AP Poll. (#) Tournament seedings in parentheses.
