= 1965–66 Wisconsin Badgers men's basketball team =

American college basketball season

1965–66 Wisconsin Badgers men's basketball
- Conference: Big Ten Conference
- Record: 11–13 (6–8 Big Ten)
- Head coach: John Erickson
- Home arena: UW Fieldhouse

1965–66 Big Ten Conference men's basketball standings
	Conf.				Overall
Team	W		L	PCT	W		L	PCT
No. 9 Michigan	11	–	3	.786	18	–	8	.692
Michigan State	10	–	4	.714	15	–	7	.682
Iowa	8	–	6	.571	17	–	7	.708
Illinois	8	–	6	.571	12	–	12	.500
Minnesota	7	–	7	.500	14	–	10	.583
Northwestern	7	–	7	.500	12	–	12	.500
Wisconsin	6	–	8	.429	11	–	13	.458
Ohio State	5	–	9	.357	11	–	13	.458
Indiana	4	–	10	.286	8	–	16	.333
Purdue	4	–	10	.286	8	–	16	.333
Rankings from AP Poll

The 1965–66 Wisconsin Badgers men's basketball team represented University of Wisconsin–Madison. The head coach was John Erickson, coaching his seventh season with the Badgers. The team played their home games at the UW Fieldhouse in Madison, Wisconsin and was a member of the Big Ten Conference.

== Schedule ==
Date time, TV	Rank^{#}	Opponent^{#}	Result	Record	Site city, state
Regular Season
12/01/1965*		Nebraska	L 88–101	0–1	UW Fieldhouse; Madison, WI
12/04/1965*		Notre Dame	W 97–79	1–1	UW Fieldhouse; Madison, WI
12/11/1965*		at Houston	L 57–82	1–2	Delmar Fieldhouse; Houston, TX
12/14/1965		Illinois	L 70–90	1–3 (0–1)	UW Fieldhouse; Madison, WI
12/17/1965*		vs. Washington; Milwaukee Classic	L 67–81	1–4	Milwaukee Arena; Milwaukee, WI
12/18/1965*		vs. West Virginia; Milwaukee Classic	L 93–101	1–5	Milwaukee Arena; Milwaukee, WI
12/20/1965*		Montana	W 76–72	2–5	UW Fieldhouse; Madison, WI
12/22/1965*		at Cincinnati	L 74–87	2–6	Armory Fieldhouse; Cincinnati, OH
12/29/1965*		Pennsylvania	W 84–70	3–6	UW Fieldhouse; Madison, WI
1/03/1966*		at Marquette	W 73–72	4–6	Marquette Gymnasium; Milwaukee, WI
1/08/1966		No. 7 Iowa	W 69–68	5–6 (1–1)	UW Fieldhouse; Madison, WI
1/11/1966		at Illinois	L 64–80	5–7 (1–2)	Assembly Hall; Champaign, IL
1/27/1966*		Hardin–Simmons	W 83–63	6–7	UW Fieldhouse; Madison, WI
1/29/1966		Michigan	L 67–69	6–8 (1–3)	UW Fieldhouse; Madison, WI
1/31/1966		at Ohio State	L 81–87 ^{OT}	6–9 (1–4)	St. John Arena; Columbus, OH
2/05/1966		at Michigan State	L 65–79	6–10 (1–5)	Jenison Fieldhouse; East Lansing, MI
2/07/1966		Indiana	W 79–78	7–10 (2–5)	UW Fieldhouse; Madison, WI
2/12/1966		at No. 10 Michigan	L 102–120	7–11 (2–6)	Yost Field House; Ann Arbor, MI
2/19/1966		Michigan State	W 78–77	8–11 (3–6)	UW Fieldhouse; Madison, WI
2/21/1966		at Northwestern	L 65–76	8–12 (3–7)	Welsh-Ryan Arena; Evanston, IL
2/26/1966		at Iowa	L 70–80	8–13 (3–8)	Iowa Field House; Iowa City, IA
2/28/1966		Northwestern	W 90–62	9–13 (4–8)	UW Fieldhouse; Madison, WI
3/05/1966		Purdue	W 69–68	10–13 (5–8)	UW Fieldhouse; Madison, WI
3/07/1966		at Minnesota	W 87–74	11–13 (6–8)	Williams Arena; Minneapolis, MN
*Non-conference game. ^{#}Rankings from AP Poll. (#) Tournament seedings in parentheses.
