= Charlie Luce =

American basketball coach and athletic director (1929–2022)

Biographical details
- Born: January 4, 1929; Peoria, Illinois, U.S.
- Died: January 5, 2022 (aged 93); Doylestown, Pennsylvania, U.S.

Coaching career (HC unless noted)
- 1951–1952: Boston University (Freshmen)
- 1952–1953: Hendrick Hudson HS (NY)
- 1953–1957: Dobbs Ferry HS (NY)
- 1957–1966: Greenwich HS (CT)
- 1966–1971: Boston University
- 1974–1980: Connecticut College

Administrative career (AD unless noted)
- 1971–1974: Boston University (assistant AD)
- 1974–1992: Connecticut College

Head coaching record
- Overall: 88–143 (college); 201–69 (high school)

Charles Barton Luce (January 4, 1929 – January 5, 2022) was an American basketball coach and administrator who was the head men's basketball coach at Boston University from 1966 to 1971 and the director of athletics at Connecticut College from 1974 to 1992.

== Early life ==
Luce was born in Peoria, Illinois and attended high school in Indianapolis and Rye, New York. He attended Boston University, where he was a member of the Boston University Terriers men's basketball team and majored in physical education. In 1950, he married his high school sweetheart, Gay Devine Luce. They had four sons.

== Coaching ==
Luce graduated from B.U. in 1951 and was coach of the freshman basketball team during the 1951–52 season. He then embarked on a career in high school basketball. After a season at Hendrick Hudson High School, Luce became head coach at Dobbs Ferry High School, which had only won three games in the past three seasons. From 1953 to 1957, Luce's teams won five league titles and he was twice named the area's coach of the year. In 1957, he took over as head coach of Greenwich High School, which had not had a winning season in ten seasons. He led the team to five consecutive winning seasons. In 1965, he moved from the basketball court to the gridiron and led the Greenwich High football team to a 7–2 record. His overall record at the high school level was 201–69.

In 1966, Luce was named head basketball coach at Boston University. He had a 49–70 record over his five seasons as head coach. In 1971, he was promoted to full-time assistant athletic director.

In 1974, Luce became the athletic director at Connecticut College. During his tenure, the school doubled the number of sports, adding men's ice hockey, men's lacrosse, women's soccer, and men's and women's crew, was granted entry into the New England Small College Athletic Conference, constructed two new athletic facilities (Dayton Arena and Dawley Field), and planned a third (Lyn and David Silfen Track and Field) that would be completed after he stepped down in 1992. From 1974 to 1980, he was also the school's men's basketball coach and compiled a record of 39–73. He remained with the Connecticut College for as an advancement officer before retiring in 1994. He was inducted into the Connecticut College Athletic Hall of Fame in 1996.

== Later life ==
Luce was predeceased by his first wife and married Margery "Bunny" Sigler in 2005. They settled in Doylestown, Pennsylvania, where he remained until his death on January 5, 2022.
