= 1965–66 Michigan Wolverines men's basketball team =

American college basketball season

1965–66 Michigan Wolverines men's basketball

Big Ten regular season champions

NCAA tournament, Elite Eight
- Conference: Big Ten Conference

Ranking
- Coaches: No. 7
- AP: No. 9
- Record: 18–8 (11–3 Big Ten)
- Head coach: Dave Strack
- Assistant coaches: James Skala; Tom Jorgensen (Freshman coach); George Pomey
- MVP: Cazzie Russell
- Captain: Oliver Darden
- Home arena: Fielding H. Yost Field House

1965–66 Big Ten Conference men's basketball standings
	Conf.				Overall
Team	W		L	PCT	W		L	PCT
No. 9 Michigan	11	–	3	.786	18	–	8	.692
Michigan State	10	–	4	.714	15	–	7	.682
Iowa	8	–	6	.571	17	–	7	.708
Illinois	8	–	6	.571	12	–	12	.500
Minnesota	7	–	7	.500	14	–	10	.583
Northwestern	7	–	7	.500	12	–	12	.500
Wisconsin	6	–	8	.429	11	–	13	.458
Ohio State	5	–	9	.357	11	–	13	.458
Indiana	4	–	10	.286	8	–	16	.333
Purdue	4	–	10	.286	8	–	16	.333
Rankings from AP Poll

The 1965–66 Michigan Wolverines men's basketball team represented the University of Michigan in intercollegiate college basketball during the 1965–66 season. The team played its home games at Fielding H. Yost Field House (renamed Yost Ice Arena in 1973) on the school's campus in Ann Arbor, Michigan. Under the direction of head coach Dave Strack, the team won the Big Ten Conference Championship.

== Season review ==
This was the last of three consecutive Big Ten titles and NCAA Division I men's basketball tournament appearances. The team earned the Big Ten team statistical championships for both scoring offense (95.4) and scoring margin (9.9) as well as field goal percentage (48.9). Senior Cazzie Russell averaged 30.8 points per game, including 33.2 in conference games to lead the conference. Rusell also led the conference in field goal percentage (.542). The team was ranked in the Associated Press Top Ten Poll ten of the fifteen weeks, starting the season ranked number two and ending it ranked number nine. The team also finished the season ranked number seven in the final UPI Coaches' Poll. Oliver Darden served as team captain, while Russell earned team MVP. On February 18, 1966, Craig Dill went 12 for 12 in free throw attempts against Ohio State, which was a school single-game record for most without a miss until C. J. Kupec made 14 on January 2, 1975. This surpassed Oliver Darden's total of 11 set the prior season.

== Schedule ==
1965-66 Overall: 18-8 Big Ten: 11-3 (1st | Champions) Postseason: NCAA (Mideast) (Elite Eight) Head Coach: Dave Strack Staff: James Skala & Tom Jorgensen (Freshmen) Captain: Oliver Darden Home Arena: Yost Field House (7,500)

Date Rk Opponent H/A W/L Score +/-
12/1/1965 #2 Tennessee H W 71-63 +8
12/4/1965 #2 Bowling Green H W 108-70 +38
12/6/1965 #2 Ball State H W 107-70 +37
12/8/1965 #2 at Wichita State A L 94-100 -6
12/11/1965 #2 vs. San Francisco N1 W 96-78 +18
12/21/1965 #3 vs. #1 Duke N2 L 93-100 -7
12/22/1965 #3 at Butler A L 64-79 -15
12/27/1965 #3 vs. Arizona State N3 L 87-89 -2
12/29/1965 #7 vs. Air Force N3 W 83-74 +9
12/30/1965 #7 vs. Washington State N3 W 93-81 +12
1/8/1966 - at Ohio State+ A W 83-78 +5
1/10/1966 - Indiana+ H W 88-68 +20
1/15/1966 - at Northwestern+ A W 93-86 +7
1/22/1966 - Minnesota+ H W 97-85 +12
1/29/1966 - Wisconsin+ H W 69-67 +2
2/1/1966 #9 Illinois+ H L 93-99 -6
2/5/1966 #9 Indiana+ H W 93-76 +17
2/12/1966 #10 Wisconsin+ H W 120-102 +18
2/19/1966 #10 Purdue+ H W 128-94 +34
2/21/1966 #10 at Iowa+ A L 82-91 -9
2/26/1966 #10 at Purdue+ A W 105-85 +20
2/28/1966 #10 Iowa+ H W 103-88 +15
3/5/1966 - Northwestern+ H W 105-92 +13
3/7/1966 - at Michigan State+ A L 77-86 -9
3/11/1966 #9 vs. #10 Western Kentucky N4 W 80-79 +1
3/12/1966 #9 vs. #1 Kentucky N4 L 77-84 -7

(1) Played in Chicago, Ill. (Chicago Stadium) (2) Played in Detroit, Mich. (Cobo Arena) (3) Far West Classic, Portland, Ore. (Memorial Coliseum) (4) NCAA Tournament, Iowa City, Iowa (Iowa Field House)

== Postseason ==
In the 22-team 1966 NCAA Division I men's basketball tournament, Michigan reached the elite eight in the Mideast region by earning a bye and defeating the Western Kentucky Hilltoppers 80–79. The team then fell to the Kentucky Wildcats 84–77.

== Accomplishments ==
Russell won the Chicago Tribune Silver Basketball as Big Ten MVP for a second year in a row. When Russell was selected as a 1966 NCAA Men's Basketball All-American for the third year in a row it was the first three-time recognition for a Wolverine. Following the season Russell was the Number one overall player selected in the NBA draft. He won the numerous national player of the year awards including the Oscar Robertson Trophy, Associated Press College Basketball Player of the Year, UPI College Basketball Player of the Year, Sporting News Men's College Basketball Player of the Year and the Helms Foundation College Basketball Player of the Year.

Russell and the team set numerous Big Ten Conference records. Russell set the following record: single-season field goals made (308 all games, broken 1981), single-season field goals made per game (13.0 conference games, broken 1969) and career field goals made (839, 1964–66, broken 1970). In addition, the team set conference game records for single-season points per game 95.4 (broken 1969) Also, on February 19, 1966, against Purdue, the team set conference records for single-game points (128 broken December 30, 2006) and single-game field goals made (52, broken December 19, 1972).

Russell also established numerous scoring records. He became the first Wolverine to total 800 points in a season, surpassing his own junior season total of 694 that surpassed his sophomore season record. This total has been surpassed by Glen Rice, but his 30.77 points per game still stands as a Michigan record. He also surpassed Bill Buntin's career totals and career average points records with 2164 points and 27.1. The average continues to be the school record, but Mike McGee eclipsed the total record. Furthermore, he surpassed John Tidwell's single-game total of 43 with a 45-point effort on December 11, 1965, against San Francisco and then established the current school record of 48 on March 5, 1966, against Northwestern. Many of Russells points were scored on free throws. He continues to hold the school's career free throw record with 486, which surpassed Buntin's 385 total but has been surpassed by the vacated 505 total of Louis Bullock. In 1966, he also set the current school single-season total record of 184, which eclipsed his own record of 152 set the prior year. His career percentage record of 82.65 has also been surpassed by Bullock's vacated statistics (86.03%), but Lester Abram also surpassed this mark with an 82.93% in 2007.

On December 1, 1964, the team began a 17-game home winning streak against the Ball State that continued through a January 29, 1966, victory over Wisconsin. This surpassed the 16-game streak from February 22, 1947 – February 7, 1949, and stood as the longest home winning streak in school history until a 22-game streak that started on January 12, 1976.

=== Statistics ===
The team posted the following statistics:

Name	GP	GS	Min	Avg	FG	FGA	FG%	3FG	3FGA	3FG%	FT	FTA	FT%	OR	DR	RB	Avg	Ast	Avg	PF	DQ	TO	Stl	Blk	Pts	Avg
Cazzie Russell	26	26			308			--	--		184	223	0.825			217	8.3			58	1				800	30.8
John Clawson	26	26			165			--	--		79	104	0.760			186	7.2			94	5				409	15.7
Oliver Darden	25	25			141			--	--		64	110	0.582			241	9.6			94	6				346	13.8
Jim Myers	26	21			148			--	--		45	60	0.750			215	8.3			59	2				341	13.1
John Thompson	24	20			68			--	--		31	42	0.738			47	2.0			54	1				167	7.0
Craig Dill	26	6			60			--	--		33	42	0.786			99	3.8			66	2				153	5.9
Dennis Bankey	24	6			40			--	--		18	33	0.545			47	2.0			34	0				98	4.1
Dan Brown	15	0			9			--	--		13	20	0.650			24	1.6			15	0				31	2.1
Jim Pitts	11	0			8			--	--		7	18	0.389			13	1.2			8	0				23	2.1
Van Tillotson	9	0			5			--	--		1	2	0.500			15	1.7			5	0				11	1.2
Marc Delzer	6	0			2			--	--		2	4	0.500			5	0.8			3	0				6	1.0
Martin Slebodnik	3	0			1			--	--		0	0				3	1.0			0	0				2	0.7
Mark Fritz	1	0			1	1	1.000	--	--		0	0				0	0.0			0	0				2	2.0
TEAM	26															163	6.3									
Season Total	26				956						477	658	0.725			1275	49.0			490	17				2389	91.9
Opponents	26				856			--	--		442	628	0.704			1085	41.7			496	21				2154	82.8

== Rankings ==
Ranking movements Legend: ██ Increase in ranking ██ Decrease in ranking
	Week														
Poll	Pre	1	2	3	4	5	6	7	8	9	10	11	12	13	Final
AP Poll	2	2	3	3	7					9	10	10	10		9

== Team players drafted into the NBA ==
Three players from this team were selected in the NBA draft.

Year	Round	Pick	Overall	Player	NBA Club
1966	1	1	1	Cazzie Russell	New York Knicks
1966	3	2	22	Oliver Darden	Detroit Pistons
1967	4	11	42	Craig Dill	San Diego Rockets

== See also ==
- 1966 NCAA Division I men's basketball tournament
- NCAA Men's Division I Tournament bids by school
- NCAA Men's Division I Tournament bids by school and conference
- NCAA Division I men's basketball tournament all-time team records
