= 1965–66 Western Kentucky Hilltoppers basketball team =

American college basketball season

1965–66 Western Kentucky Hilltoppers basketball

Ohio Valley Conference Champion OVC Tournament Champion

NCAA Tournament, Sweet Sixteen Mideast Region 3rd Place
- Conference: Ohio Valley Conference

Ranking
- AP: No. 10
- Record: 25–3 (14–0 OVC)
- Head coach: John Oldham
- Assistant coach: Gene Rhodes
- Home arena: E. A. Diddle Arena

The 1965–66 Western Kentucky Hilltoppers men's basketball team represented Western Kentucky University during the 1965-66 NCAA University Division Basketball season. The Hilltoppers were led by Ohio Valley Conference Coach of the Year John Oldham and OVC Player of the Year Clem Haskins. WKU won the OVC tournament and season championship, as well as the conference's automatic bid to the 1966 NCAA University Division basketball tournament, where they advanced to the Sweet Sixteen and finished 3rd in the Mideast Region. The conference tournament was held in December and had no impact on the conference standing; the conference NCAA tournament bid was awarded to the season champion.

This team was the recipient of what many Hilltopper fans referred to as “the worst call in NCAA tournament history.” In the second-round game against Michigan, Western Kentucky forced a jump ball with seconds left, while leading by 1 point. Western Kentucky's Greg Smith was called for a foul during the jump and Michigan's Cazzie Russell made two free throws to win the game. Still pictures show Russell not jumping on the play and then leaning in to make contact with Smith.

Haskins was joined on the All-Conference and OVC Tournament teams by Steve Cunningham, Dwight Smith, and Greg Smith

== Schedule ==
Date time, TV	Rank^{#}	Opponent^{#}	Result	Record	Site city, state
Regular Season
12/2/1965*		Parsons (IA)	W 98–77	1–0	E. A. Diddle Arena; Bowling Green, KY
12/4/1965*		La Salle	W 93–67	2–0	E. A. Diddle Arena; Bowling Green, KY
12/6/1965*		Campbellsville	W 101–59	3–0	E. A. Diddle Arena; Bowling Green, KY
12/11/1965*		Memphis State	W 100–61	4–0	E. A. Diddle Arena; Bowling Green, KY
12/14/1965*		Abilene Christian	W 84–59	5–0	E. A. Diddle Arena; Bowling Green, KY
12/17/1965*		vs. SMU; Vanderbilt Invitational	W 82–68	6–0	Memorial Gymnasium; Nashville, TN
12/18/1965*		at Vanderbilt; Vanderbilt Invitational	L 69–72	6–1	Memorial Gymnasium; Nashville, TN
12/20/1965		vs. Morehead State; OVC Tournament	W 80–55	7–1	Convention Center; Louisville, KY
12/21/1965		vs. Tennessee Tech; OVC Tournament Semifinal	W 78–63	8–1	Convention Center; Louisville, KY
12/22/1965		vs. Eastern Kentucky; OVC Tournament Final	W 83–67	9–1	Convention Center; Louisville, KY
1/8/1966		at Tennessee Tech	W 120–92	10–1 (1-0)	Memorial Gymnasium; Cookeville, TN
1/10/1966		East Tennessee	W 85–69	11–1 (2-0)	E. A. Diddle Arena; Bowling Green, KY
1/15/1966		at Eastern Kentucky	W 107–88	12–1 (3-0)	Alumni Coliseum; Richmond, KY
1/17/1966		at Morehead State	W 45–35	13–1 (4-0)	Wetherby Gymnasium; Morehead, KY
1/22/1966*		at Dayton	L 57–77	13–2	UD Arena; Dayton, OH
1/31/1966		at Middle Tennessee	W 93–56	14–2 (5-0)	Alumni Memorial Gym; Murfreesboro, TN
2/5/1966		at Murray State	W 101–84	15–2 (6-0)	Racer Arena; Murray, KY
2/7/1966		at Austin Peay	W 94–67	16–2 (7-0)	Memorial Health Gymnasium; Clarksville, TN
2/12/1966		at East Tennessee	W 96–79	17–2 (8-0)	Brooks Gymnasium; Johnson City, TN
2/14/1966		Tennessee Tech	W 85–72	18–2 (9-0)	E. A. Diddle Arena; Bowling Green, KY
2/19/1966		Morehead State	W 73–58	19–2 (10-0)	E. A. Diddle Arena; Bowling Green, KY
2/21/1966		Eastern Kentucky	W 72–67	20–2 (11-0)	E. A. Diddle Arena; Bowling Green, KY
2/26/1966		Murray State	W 71–59	21–2 (12-0)	E. A. Diddle Arena; Bowling Green, KY
2/28/1966		Middle Tennessee	W 81–47	22–2 (13-0)	E. A. Diddle Arena; Bowling Green, KY
3/3/1966		Austin Peay	W 76–63	23–2 (14-0)	E. A. Diddle Arena; Bowling Green, KY
1966 NCAA University Division basketball tournament
3/7/1966*		vs. No. 4 Loyola (IL); Mideast Region First Round	W 105–86	24–2	Memorial Athletic and Convocation Center; Kent, OH
3/11/1966*	No. 10	vs. No. 9 Michigan; Sweet Sixteen	L 79–80	24–3	Iowa Field House; Iowa City, IA
3/12/1966*	No. 10	vs. No. 20 UPI Dayton; Mideast Region Consolation	W 82–68	25–3	Iowa Field House; Iowa City, IA
*Non-conference game. ^{#}Rankings from AP Poll. (#) Tournament seedings in parentheses.
