= 1965–66 Illinois Fighting Illini men's basketball team =

American college basketball season

1965–66 Illinois Fighting Illini men's basketball
- Conference: Big Ten Conference
- Record: 12–12 (8–6 Big Ten)
- Head coach: Harry Combes (19th season)
- Assistant coaches: Howie Braun (29th season); Jim Wright (8th season)
- MVP: Donnie Freeman
- Captain: Donnie Freeman
- Home arena: Assembly Hall

1965–66 Big Ten Conference men's basketball standings
	Conf.				Overall
Team	W		L	PCT	W		L	PCT
No. 9 Michigan	11	–	3	.786	18	–	8	.692
Michigan State	10	–	4	.714	15	–	7	.682
Iowa	8	–	6	.571	17	–	7	.708
Illinois	8	–	6	.571	12	–	12	.500
Minnesota	7	–	7	.500	14	–	10	.583
Northwestern	7	–	7	.500	12	–	12	.500
Wisconsin	6	–	8	.429	11	–	13	.458
Ohio State	5	–	9	.357	11	–	13	.458
Indiana	4	–	10	.286	8	–	16	.333
Purdue	4	–	10	.286	8	–	16	.333
Rankings from AP Poll

The 1965–66 Illinois Fighting Illini men's basketball team represented the University of Illinois.

== Regular season ==
Harry Combes entered his 19th season as the head coach of the Fighting Illini. The program was heading in a positive direction with six up-and-coming sophomores joining a varsity team that already included five juniors and five seniors. This balance was demonstrated within the starting lineup which included a rotation of two sophomores, two juniors and two seniors. The starters included, Don Freeman and Rich Jones as forwards, Preston Pearson and Bob Brown as guards, and Ron Dunlap at center.

It was during this season that Freeman would mark his place in Illini history by setting a record for most points in a season (668), while averaging 27.8 points per game. When he finished at Illinois, he had totaled 1449 points and averaged 20.1 points and 10.3 rebounds per game over his three varsity seasons. This offensive output led to Freeman being named a 1st-team All-American by the Helms Foundation, a 2nd-team All-American by Converse and Basketball News, and honorable mention with UPI,

=== Roster ===
1965–66 Illinois Fighting Illini men's basketball team
Players
Coaches

Pos.	#	Name	Height	Weight	Year	Previous school	Hometown
F	10	John Prescott	6 ft 6 in (1.98 m)	185 lb (84 kg)	So	Lake Forest High School	Lake Forest, Illinois
G	11	Benny Louis	6 ft 2 in (1.88 m)	170 lb (77 kg)	So	Pinckneyville Community High School	Pinckneyville, Illinois
G	12	Greg Wright	6 ft 1 in (1.85 m)	195 lb (88 kg)	So	Homewood-Flossmoor High School	Glenwood, Illinois
G/F	14	Jerry Mettille	6 ft 4 in (1.93 m)	180 lb (82 kg)	Jr	Morris Community High School	Morris, Illinois
G	15	Donnie Freeman (C)	6 ft 3 in (1.91 m)	180 lb (82 kg)	Sr	Madison High School	Madison, Illinois
F	20	Rich Crusius	6 ft 6 in (1.98 m)	175 lb (79 kg)	So	Bloomington High School	Bloomington, Illinois
F	21	Bob Johansen	6 ft 5 in (1.96 m)	190 lb (86 kg)	Jr	Geneva High School	Geneva, Illinois
G	24	Jim Dawson	6 ft 0 in (1.83 m)	170 lb (77 kg)	Jr	York High School	Elmhurst, Illinois
G	25	Preston Pearson	6 ft 1 in (1.85 m)	190 lb (86 kg)	Jr	Freeport High School	Freeport, Illinois
F	30	Deon Flessner	6 ft 4 in (1.93 m)	200 lb (91 kg)	Jr	Fithian High School	Fithian, Illinois
G	22	Jim Vopicka	6 ft 1 in (1.85 m)	175 lb (79 kg)	Jr	Morton West High School	Brookfield, Illinois
F/C	33	Rich Jones	6 ft 7 in (2.01 m)	200 lb (91 kg)	So	Lester High School	Memphis, Tennessee
C	35	Ron Dunlap	6 ft 8 in (2.03 m)	215 lb (98 kg)	So	Farragut Academy	Chicago, Illinois
G/F	40	Bob Brown	6 ft 2 in (1.88 m)	190 lb (86 kg)	Sr	P. S. Dupont High School	Wilmington, DE
F	43	Larry Hinton	6 ft 2 in (1.88 m)	190 lb (86 kg)	Sr	Shelbyville High School	Shelbyville, Illinois
F	44	Mike Graville	6 ft 0 in (1.83 m)	185 lb (84 kg)	Sr	Madison High School	Madison, Illinois
F	54	Dan Lee	6 ft 2 in (1.88 m)	185 lb (84 kg)	Sr	Attica High School	Attica, Indiana

Head coach

- Harry Combes (University of Illinois) (19th year)

Assistant coach(es)

- Howie Braun (University of Illinois) (29th year)
- Jim Wright (University of Illinois) (8th year)

Legend

- (C) Team captain
- (S) Suspended
- (I) Ineligible
- (W) Walk-on
- Injured
- Current redshirt

Roster

== Schedule ==
Date time, TV	Rank^{#}	Opponent^{#}	Result	Record	Site (attendance) city, state
Non-Conference regular season
12/1/1965*		Butler	W 88-74	1-0	Assembly Hall (9,167); Champaign, IL
12/3/1965*		at BYU	L 98-109	1-1	Marriott Center (11,488); Provo, Utah
12/4/1965*		at No. 1 UCLA	L 79-97	1-2	Pauley Pavilion (12,365); Los Angeles, CA
12/8/1965*		Kentucky	L 68-86	1-3	Assembly Hall (7,966); Champaign, IL
12/11/1965*		West Virginia	W 96-86	2-3	Assembly Hall (6,251); Champaign, IL
12/14/1965		at Wisconsin	W 90-70	3-3 (1-0)	Wisconsin Field House (8,206); Madison, WI
12/18/1965*		vs. Princeton	L 81-84	3-4	Chicago Stadium (6,038); Chicago, IL
12/27/1965*		vs. Georgetown; ECAC Holiday Festival	W 96-94	4-4	Madison Square Garden (8,757); New York, NY
12/28/1965*		vs. No. 10 Providence; ECAC Holiday Festival	L 79-81	4-5	Madison Square Garden (12,239); New York, NY
12/30/1965*		vs. Army; ECAC Holiday Festival	L 69-78	4-6	Madison Square Garden (18,499); New York, NY
Big Ten regular season
1/8/1966		at Indiana; Rivalry	W 98-84	5-6 (2-0)	New Fieldhouse (7,502); Bloomington, IN
1/11/1966		Wisconsin	W 80-64	6-6 (3-0)	Assembly Hall (6,127); Champaign, IL
1/15/1966		at Purdue	L 87-93	6-7 (3-1)	Mackey Arena (8,936); West Lafayette, IN
1/28/1966*		vs. Notre Dame	W 120-92	7-7	Chicago Stadium (18,183); Chicago, IL
2/1/1966		at No. 4 Michigan	W 99-93	8-7 (4-1)	Crisler Arena (9,544); Ann Arbor, MI
2/5/1966		Ohio State	W 78-77	9-7 (5-1)	Assembly Hall (9,838); Champaign, IL
2/7/1966		Northwestern; Rivalry	L 77-80	9-8 (5-2)	Assembly Hall (7,695); Champaign, IL
2/12/1966		Indiana; Rivalry	L 77-81	9-9 (5-3)	Assembly Hall (8,175); Champaign, IL
2/19/1966		Minnesota	W 100-89	10-9 (6-3)	Assembly Hall (8,643); Champaign, IL
2/22/1966		at Michigan State	L 66-68	10-10 (6-4)	Jenison Fieldhouse (10,484); East Lansing, MI
2/26/1966		at Minnesota	L 92-94	10-11 (6-5)	Williams Arena (7,340); Minneapolis, MN
2/28/1966		Purdue	W 98-81	11-11 (7-5)	Assembly Hall (6,207); Champaign, IL
3/5/1966		Iowa; Rivalry	W 106-90	12-11 (8-5)	Assembly Hall (9,592); Champaign, IL
3/7/1966		at Northwestern; Rivalry	L 76-84	12-12 (8-6)	McGaw Memorial Hall (4,800); Evanston, IL
*Non-conference game. ^{#}Rankings from AP Poll. (#) Tournament seedings in parentheses. All times are in Central Time.

== Player stats ==
Player	Games played	Field goals	Free throws	Rebounds	Points
Don Freeman	24	258	152	285	668
Rich Jones	24	206	96	265	508
Jim Dawson	24	163	42	100	368
Deon Flessner	24	48	38	127	134
Bob Brown	15	44	24	42	112
Preston Pearson	22	38	30	68	106
Ron Dunlap	23	28	32	109	88
Bob Johansen	20	27	11	37	65
Larry Hinton	20	12	7	13	31
Benny Louis	15	4	4	12	12
Jerry Mettile	6	2	2	2	6
Mike Graville	1	0	0	0	0

== Awards and honors ==
- Don Freeman
  - Team Most Valuable Player
  - 1st team All-American (Helms)
  - 2nd team All-American (Converse)
  - 2nd team All-American (Basketball News)
  - Honorable Mention All-American (UPI)
- Rich Jones
  - Honorable Mention All-American (Converse)

== Team players drafted into the NBA ==
Player	NBA club	Round	Pick
Don Freeman	Philadelphia 76ers	3	9
