= 1965–66 Michigan State Spartans men's basketball team =

American college basketball season

1965–66 Michigan State Spartans men's basketball
- Conference: Big Ten Conference
- Record: 15–7 (10–4 Big Ten)
- Head coach: John E. Benington (1st season)
- Assistant coach: Robert Nordmann
- Captain: William Curtis
- Home arena: Jenison Fieldhouse

1965–66 Big Ten Conference men's basketball standings
| | Conf. | | | | Overall |
| Team | W | | L | PCT | W | | L | PCT |
|---|---|---|---|---|---|---|---|---|
| No. 9 Michigan | 11 | – | 3 | .786 | 18 | – | 8 | .692 |
| Michigan State | 10 | – | 4 | .714 | 15 | – | 7 | .682 |
| Iowa | 8 | – | 6 | .571 | 17 | – | 7 | .708 |
| Illinois | 8 | – | 6 | .571 | 12 | – | 12 | .500 |
| Minnesota | 7 | – | 7 | .500 | 14 | – | 10 | .583 |
| Northwestern | 7 | – | 7 | .500 | 12 | – | 12 | .500 |
| Wisconsin | 6 | – | 8 | .429 | 11 | – | 13 | .458 |
| Ohio State | 5 | – | 9 | .357 | 11 | – | 13 | .458 |
| Indiana | 4 | – | 10 | .286 | 8 | – | 16 | .333 |
| Purdue | 4 | – | 10 | .286 | 8 | – | 16 | .333 |
Rankings from AP Poll

The 1965–66 Michigan State Spartans men's basketball team represented Michigan State University in the 1965–66 NCAA Division I men's basketball season as members of the Big Ten Conference. They played their home games at Jenison Fieldhouse in East Lansing, Michigan and were coached by John E. Benington in his first year as head coach of the Spartans. They finished the season 15–7, 10–4 in Big Ten play to finish in second place.

== Previous season ==
The Spartans finished the 1964–65 season 5–18, 1–13 in Big Ten play to finish in last place.

Following the season, head coach Forrest "Forddy" Anderson was fired after 11 years as the Spartans' head coach. Shortly thereafter, the school hired John E. Benington, head coach at Saint Louis, as head coach.

== Roster and statistics ==
1965–66 Michigan State Spartans men's basketball team
| No | Name | Pos | Year | Height | Pts | Reb |
|---|---|---|---|---|---|---|
| 11 | John Gorman | G | SR | 5–11 | 2.2 | 0.2 |
| 12 | John Bailey | G | SO | 6–0 | 8.1 | 3.2 |
| 13 | Edward "Ted" Crary | F | JR | 6–5 | 0.8 | – |
| 14 | Gary Spade | G | SO | 5–11 | – | – |
| 15 | Steven Rymal | G | SO | 5–11 | 8.3 | 2.8 |
| 21 | James O'Brien | G | SO | 6–3 | 0.7 | – |
| 22 | Shannon Reading | G | JR | 6–1 | 6.0 | 1.8 |
| 23 | James Kupper | G | SR | 6–0 | 1.3 | 0.5 |
| 24 | Stan Washington links to wrong Stan Washington | G | SR | 6–3 | 18.0 | 10.6 |
| 25 | William Curtis | F | SR | 6–8 | 16.4 | 9.3 |
| 32 | Jack Wynn | C | SO | 6–10 | 1.0 | – |
| 33 | Heywood Edwards | F | SO | 6–5 | 1.7 | – |
| 35 | Robert Miller | F | SR | 6–5 | 1.3 | 1.1 |
| 41 | Arthur Baylor | F | SO | 6–6 | 4.5 | 3.6 |
| 42 | Gerald Geistler | C | SO | 6–8 | 0.8 | – |
| 43 | Richard Holmes | F | SR | 6–4 | 1.4 | – |
| 44 | David Keeler | F | JR | 6–8 | 1.0 | – |
| 45 | Matthew Aitch | C | JR | 6–7 | 13.8 | 8.8 |

== Schedule and results ==
The Spartans participated in the second annual Rainbow Classic at the Honolulu International Center from December 27–30, 1966. There they played against a Marine and Army team in the tournament. These games do not count on the official record.

| Date time, TV | Rank^{#} | Opponent^{#} | Result | Record | Site city, state |
Non-conference regular season
| Dec 4, 1965* | | Western Michigan | L 82–85 | 0–1 | Jenison Fieldhouse; East Lansing, MI |
| Dec 7, 1965* | | at Bowling Green | W 84–59 | 1–1 | Anderson Arena; Bowling Green, OH |
| Dec 9, 1965* | | Butler | W 75–59 | 2–1 | Jenison Fieldhouse; East Lansing, MI |
| Dec 11, 1965* | | at Notre Dame | W 93–69 | 3–1 | Notre Dame Fieldhouse; South Bend, IN |
| Dec 18, 1965* | | Saint Joseph's | L 65–82 | 3–2 | Jenison Fieldhouse; East Lansing, MI |
| Dec 20, 1965* | | Tulane | W 80–61 | 4–2 | Jenison Fieldhouse; East Lansing, MI |
| Dec 22, 1965* | | at Drake | W 61–50 | 5–2 | Veterans Memorial Auditorium; Des Moines, IA |
| Dec 27, 1965* | | vs. Hawaiian Marines; Rainbow Classic | W 84–53 | | Honolulu International Center; Honolulu, HI |
| Dec 28, 1965* | | vs. Tulsa; Rainbow Classic | L 67–78 | 5–3 | Honolulu International Center; Honolulu, HI |
| Dec 30, 1965* | | vs. Hawaiian Army; Rainbow Classic | W 97–69 | | Honolulu International Center; Honolulu, HI |
Big Ten regular season
| Jan 8, 1966 | | Minnesota | W 85–65 | 6–3 (1–0) | Jenison Fieldhouse; East Lansing, MI |
| Jan 10, 1966 | | at Purdue | W 92–74 | 7–3 (2–0) | Lambert Fieldhouse; West Lafayette, IN |
| Jan 15, 1966 | | Ohio State | W 80–64 | 8–3 (3–0) | Jenison Fieldhouse; East Lansing, MI |
| Jan 22, 1966 | | at Iowa | L 76–90 | 8–4 (3–1) | Iowa Fieldhouse; Iowa City, IA |
| Jan 24, 1966 | | Purdue | W 92–74 | 9–4 (4–1) | Jenison Fieldhouse; East Lansing, MI |
| Jan 29, 1966 | | at Northwestern | W 77–68 | 10–4 (5–1) | Welsh-Ryan Arena; Evanston, IL |
| Feb 5, 1966 | | Wisconsin | W 79–65 | 11–4 (6–1) | Jenison Fieldhouse; East Lansing, MI |
| Feb 12, 1966 | | at Minnesota | L 71–81 | 11–5 (6–2) | Williams Arena; Minneapolis, MN |
| Feb 19, 1966 | | at Wisconsin | L 77–78 | 11–6 (6–3) | Wisconsin Field House; Madison, WI |
| Feb 22, 1966 | | Illinois | W 68–66 | 12–6 (7–3) | Jenison Fieldhouse; East Lansing, MI |
| Feb 26, 1966 | | Indiana | W 69–63 | 13–6 (8–3) | Jenison Fieldhouse; East Lansing, MI |
| Feb 28, 1966 | | at Ohio State | W 98–79 | 14–6 (9–3) | St. John Arena; Columbus, OH |
| Mar 5, 1966 | | at Indiana | L 76–86 | 14–7 (9–4) | New Fieldhouse; Bloomington, IN |
| Mar 7, 1966 | | Michigan; Rivalry | W 86–77 | 15–7 (10–4) | Jenison Fieldhouse; East Lansing, MI |
*Non-conference game. ^{#}Rankings from AP Poll. (#) Tournament seedings in parentheses.
