= Warren Mitchell (basketball) =

American basketball coach (1933–2020)

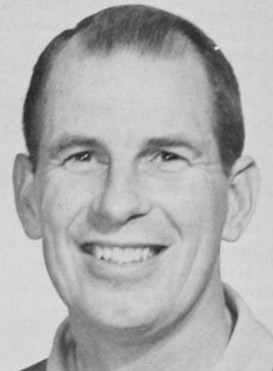

Personal information
- Born: April 1, 1933 Lynchburg, Virginia, U.S.
- Died: October 15, 2020 (aged 87) Midlothian, Virginia, U.S.
- Listed height: 6 ft 2 in (1.88 m)

Career information
- High school: E. C. Glass (Lynchburg, Virginia)
- College: Lynchburg (1953–1954); Richmond (1954–1957)
- NBA draft: 1957: undrafted
- Position: Guard

Career history

Coaching
- 1960–1964: Newport News HS
- 1964–1966: Davidson (assistant)
- 1966–1972: William & Mary

Career highlights
- First-team all-state (1957); First-team all-SoCon (1957)

Warren Eugene Mitchell Sr. (April 1, 1933 – October 15, 2020) was an American college basketball coach who was the head coach for the William & Mary Tribe men's basketball team from 1966 to 1972. In Southern Conference play, he guided his teams to a cumulative 33–37 record. Overall, Mitchell finished 58–98 in his six seasons as coach.

Mitchell died of complications from dementia and COVID-19 on October 15, 2020, during the COVID-19 pandemic in Virginia.
