= 1965–66 Iowa Hawkeyes men's basketball team =

American college basketball season

1965–66 Iowa Hawkeyes men's basketball
- Conference: Big Ten Conference
- Record: 17–7 (8–6 Big Ten)
- Head coach: Ralph Miller (2nd season)
- Assistant coaches: Lanny Van Eman; Dick Schultz
- Home arena: Iowa Field House (Capacity: 13,365)

1965–66 Big Ten Conference men's basketball standings
	Conf.				Overall
Team	W		L	PCT	W		L	PCT
No. 9 Michigan	11	–	3	.786	18	–	8	.692
Michigan State	10	–	4	.714	15	–	7	.682
Iowa	8	–	6	.571	17	–	7	.708
Illinois	8	–	6	.571	12	–	12	.500
Minnesota	7	–	7	.500	14	–	10	.583
Northwestern	7	–	7	.500	12	–	12	.500
Wisconsin	6	–	8	.429	11	–	13	.458
Ohio State	5	–	9	.357	11	–	13	.458
Indiana	4	–	10	.286	8	–	16	.333
Purdue	4	–	10	.286	8	–	16	.333
Rankings from AP Poll

The 1965–66 Iowa Hawkeyes men's basketball team represented the University of Iowa in intercollegiate basketball during the 1965–66 season. The team was led by Ralph Miller and played their home games at the Iowa Field House. The Hawkeyes finished the season 17–7 and were 8-6 in Big Ten conference games.

== Roster ==
1965–66 Iowa Hawkeyes men's basketball team
Players
Coaches

Pos.	#	Name	Height	Weight	Year	Hometown
F/C	10	Dick Agnew	—	—	So
G	11	Denny Pauling	6 ft 4 in (1.93 m)	—	Sr
G	13	Dave White	—	—	Jr
	14	Frank Nelson	—	—	Fr
F	23	Gerry Jones	6 ft 4 in (1.93 m)	—	Jr	Chicago, Illinois
G	24	Chris Phillips	6 ft 3 in (1.91 m)	—	Fr
G	25	Tom Chapman	6 ft 3 in (1.91 m)	—	Jr	Fort Dodge, Iowa
G	32	Chris Pervall	6 ft 2 in (1.88 m)	—	Sr
G	42	Rolly McGrath	6 ft 1 in (1.85 m)	—	So
F	44	Ben McGilmer	6 ft 7 in (2.01 m)	—	So
C	45	George Peeples	6 ft 7 in (2.01 m)	—	Sr
F	51	Huston Breedlove	6 ft 6 in (1.98 m)	—	So	Akron, Ohio
F	52	Gary Olson	6 ft 5 in (1.96 m)	—	Sr

Head coach

- Ralph Miller (Kansas)

Assistant coach(es)

Legend

- (C) Team captain
- (S) Suspended
- (I) Ineligible
- (W) Walk-on
- Injured
- Current redshirt

== Schedule/results ==
Date time, TV	Rank^{#}	Opponent^{#}	Result	Record	Site (attendance) city, state
Non-conference regular season
Dec 2, 1965*		Pepperdine	W 111–50	1–0	Iowa Field House; Iowa City, Iowa
Dec 4, 1965*		at Evansville	W 80–73	2–0	Roberts Municipal Stadium; Evansville, Indiana
Dec 6, 1965*		Southern Illinois	W 69–58	3–0	Iowa Field House; Iowa City, Iowa
Dec 8, 1965*		Creighton	W 103–77	4–0	Iowa Field House; Iowa City, Iowa
Dec 11, 1965*		at Drake	W 66–60	5–0	Veterans Memorial Auditorium; Des Moines, Iowa
Dec 15, 1965*		Washington	W 99–70	6–0	Iowa Field House; Iowa City, Iowa
Dec 18, 1965*		Drake	W 69–51	7–0	Iowa Field House; Iowa City, Iowa
Dec 29, 1965*	No. 4	vs. Arkansas; Sun Bowl Tournament	W 77–75	8–0	Memorial Gym; El Paso, Texas
Dec 30, 1965*	No. 4	at Texas Western; Sun Bowl Tournament	L 68–86	8–1	Memorial Gym; El Paso, Texas
Big Ten Regular Season
Jan 8, 1966	No. 7	at Wisconsin	L 68–69	8–2 (0–1)	Wisconsin Field House; Madison, Wisconsin
Jan 10, 1966		Northwestern	W 70–58	9–2 (1–1)	Iowa Field House; Iowa City, Iowa
Jan 17, 1966		at Indiana	L 61–73	9–3 (1–2)	New Field House; Bloomington, Indiana
Jan 22, 1966		Michigan State	W 90–76	10–3 (2–2)	Iowa Field House; Iowa City, Iowa
Jan 24, 1966		Ohio State	W 98–89	11–3 (3–2)	Iowa Field House; Iowa City, Iowa
Feb 5, 1966*		at Detroit	W 107–73	12–3	Calihan Hall; Detroit, Michigan
Feb 7, 1966		at Purdue	L 58–66	12–4 (3–3)	Lambert Fieldhouse; West Lafayette, Indiana
Feb 12, 1966		at Northwestern	L 73–81	12–5 (3–4)	McGaw Memorial Hall; Evanston, Illinois
Feb 15, 1966		Minnesota	W 96–87	13–5 (4–4)	Iowa Field House; Iowa City, Iowa
Feb 19, 1966		at Ohio State	W 86–80	14–5 (5–4)	St. John Arena; Columbus, Ohio
Feb 21, 1966		No. 10 Michigan	W 91–82	15–5 (6–4)	Iowa Field House; Iowa City, Iowa
Feb 26, 1966		Wisconsin	W 80–70	16–5 (7–4)	Iowa Field House; Iowa City, Iowa
Feb 28, 1966		at No. 10 Michigan	L 88–103	16–6 (7–5)	Yost Field House; Ann Arbor, Michigan
Mar 5, 1966		at Illinois; Rivalry	L 90–106	16–7 (7–6)	Assembly Hall; Champaign, Illinois
Mar 7, 1966		Indiana	W 82–77	17–7 (8–6)	Iowa Field House; Iowa City, Iowa
*Non-conference game. ^{#}Rankings from AP Poll. (#) Tournament seedings in parentheses.

== Team players in the 1966 NBA draft ==
Round	Pick	Player	NBA club
4	35	George Peeples	Baltimore Bullets
