= 1965–66 Auburn Tigers men's basketball team =

Men's college basketball team

1965–66 Auburn Tigers men's basketball

Tampa Invitational champions
- Conference: Southeastern Conference
- Record: 16–10 (8–8 SEC)
- Head coach: Bill Lynn (3rd season)
- Captain: Lee DeFore
- Home arena: Auburn Sports Arena

The 1965–66 Auburn Tigers men's basketball team represented Auburn University in the 1965–66 college basketball season. The team's head coach was Bill Lynn, who was in his third season at Auburn. The team played their home games at Auburn Sports Arena in Auburn, Alabama. They finished the season 16–10, 8–8 in SEC play.
