= Bill Haubrich =

American basketball player and coach

Biographical details
- Born: September 9, 1928; Claremont, New Hampshire, U.S.
- Died: October 2, 2021 (aged 93); Concord, New Hampshire, U.S.

Playing career
- 1948–1951: New Hampshire

Coaching career (HC unless noted)
- 1957–1963: Concord HS (NH)
- 1966–1969: New Hampshire

Administrative career (AD unless noted)
- 1969–1990: Concord School District (NH)

Head coaching record
- Overall: 20–49 (college)

Fredrick William Haubrich (September 9, 1928 – October 2, 2021) was an American coach and administrator who was the head coach of the New Hampshire Wildcats men's basketball team from 1966 to 1969 and athletic director of the Concord School District from 1969 to 1985.

== Early life ==
Haubrich grew up in Claremont, New Hampshire, and was an all-state football and basketball player at Stevens High School. He played tackle for the New Hampshire Wildcats football team and center for the UNH basketball team. He was elected co-captain of both teams his senior year, the first UNH athlete to receive that honor since 1931. He was a member of the 1950 New Hampshire Wildcats football team that finished the season undefeated and won the Yankee Conference championship.

== Coaching ==
After graduating, Haubrich served in the United States Air Force. He then returned to UNH as a graduate assistant. In 1957, he became a junior physical education teacher and boys' basketball coach at Concord High School. He led the team to a state championship in 1962. In 1963, he became a member of the athletic staff at UNH. From 1966 to 1969, he was New Hampshire's men's basketball coach. He compiled a 20–49 record over three seasons.

In 1969, Haubrich left UNH to become the athletic director of the Concord School District. He was twice named state athletic director of the year and received the National Interscholastic Athletic Administrators Association's Distinguished Service Award in 1981. He retired in 1990.
