= J. K. Kennedy =

American basketball coach

Biographical details
- Born: April 22, 1907; Lawrence, Kansas, U.S.
- Died: June 24, 1966 (aged 59); Tallahassee, Florida, U.S.

Coaching career (HC unless noted)
- 1948–1949: asst. Florida State
- 1949–1966: Florida State

Head coaching record
- Overall: 234–208

Accomplishments and honors

Championships
- Florida Intercollegiate Conference Champions (1955)

Awards
- Florida State University Hall of Fame (1977)

Jesse Kennard "Bud" Kennedy (April 22, 1907 – June 24, 1966) was Florida State men's basketball head coach from 1949 to 1966. He was born on April 22, 1907, in Lawrence, Kansas. His father, A. R. Kennedy, was head coach of the Kansas football team. Kennedy was an athlete at University of Kansas, Baker University, and Kansas State Teachers College. In 1948 he became the Florida State Seminoles Athletic Manager and Assistant head coach. The following year, he became the head coach. Kennedy went 234–208 in his 18 years at Florida State and won the Florida Intercollegiate Conference Championship in 1955. In 1966, on June, 26 he died of cancer. Kennedy was 59. Later in 1977 he was inducted into the Florida State University Hall of Fame.
