= Bill Olson (coach) =

American college sports coach (1913–1988)

Biographical details
- Born: August 31, 1913
- Died: June 12, 1988 (aged 74); Wellesley, Massachusetts, U.S.
- Education: Boston University

Coaching career (HC unless noted)

Basketball
- 1947–1948: Ripon
- 1948–1956: North Central
- 1956–1966: New Hampshire
- 1966–1978: Babson

Baseball
- 1949–1956: North Central
- 1969–1973: Babson

Football
- 1946: Dean Academy
- 1947: Ripon (assistant)
- 1948–1955: North Central

Golf
- 1973–1982: Babson

Administrative career (AD unless noted)
- 1946–1947: Dean Academy
- 1966: New Hampshire (assistant AD)
- 1966–1978: Babson

Head coaching record
- Overall: 266–422 (college basketball); 61–111–3 (college baseball); 17–44–2 (college football)

Ernest William Olson (August 31, 1913 – June 12, 1988) was an American college sports coach who was head coach of the New Hampshire Wildcats men's basketball and athletic director at Babson College.

== Biography ==
Olson was a three-sport athlete at Boston University. He began his coaching career at East Hampton High School in East Hampton, Connecticut. He served in the United States Navy during World War II. He captained two PT boats in the Mediterranean and was the captain of PT–214 in the Pacific. He was discharged with the rank of Lieutenant.

Olson resumed his coaching career at Dean Academy. In 1947, he became he head basketball and assistant football coach at Ripon College. In 1948, he moved to North Central College, where he compiled a 17–44–2 record in football, a 64–97 record in men's basketball and 40–63–3 record in baseball. In 1956, Olson became the head basketball and tennis coach at the University of New Hampshire. Over ten seasons, Olson's basketball teams amassed a 23–92 record. He resigned after the 1965–66 season to become an assistant to athletic director Andy Mooradian.

In 1966, Olson became the head basketball coach and athletic director at Babson College. Under his leadership, Babson doubled the number of intercollegiate sports teams from seven to fourteen and introduced its first three women's varsity teams (basketball, tennis, and volleyball). In 1975, Babson won the NCAA Division III men's soccer tournament. As a coach, Olson compiled a 133–151 record in men's basketball (1966–1978) and 13–20 record in baseball (1969–1973). He stepped down as AD in 1978 when he reached the mandatory retirement age of 65, but continued to coach the Babson golf team until 1982. He died on June 12, 1988 at his home in Wellesley, Massachusetts.

== Head coaching record ==
=== College football ===
| Year | Team | Overall | Conference | Standing | Bowl/playoffs |
|---|---|---|---|---|---|
North Central Cardinals (College Conference of Illinois) (1948–1955)
| 1948 | North Central | 1–7 | 1–4 | 8th | |
| 1949 | North Central | 3–4–1 | 2–3–1 | 6th | |
| 1950 | North Central | 4–4 | 2–3 | 5th | |
| 1951 | North Central | 3–5 | 2–3 | T–6th | |
| 1952 | North Central | 0–6–1 | 0–5 | 8th | |
| 1953 | North Central | 2–6 | 2–4 | 5th | |
| 1954 | North Central | 2–6 | 1–4 | 6th | |
| 1955 | North Central | 2–6 | 1–4 | 6th | |
| North Central: | | 17–44–2 | 11–30–1 | | |
| Total: | | 17–44–2 | | | |
