= 1969–70 Baltimore Bullets season =

NBA professional basketball team season

- Head coach: Gene Shue
- General manager: Joe Sachs
- Owner: Abe Pollin
- Arena: Baltimore Civic Center

Results
- Record: 50–32 (.610)
- Place: Division: 3rd (Eastern)
- Playoff finish: Division semifinals (lost to Knicks 3–4)
- Stats at Basketball Reference

Local media
- Television: WBAL-TV
- Radio: WBAL

The 1969–70 Baltimore Bullets season was their ninth season in the NBA and seventh season in the city of Baltimore. The Bullets would get started on a strong note as they won 9 straight games in November. The Bullets would finish with a record of 50–32. In a competitive Eastern Division, the Bullets finished the season 3rd place.

== Roster ==
1969–70 Baltimore Bullets roster
Players

Pos.	No.	Player	Height	Weight	DOB	From
G	3	Fred Carter	6 ft 3 in (1.91 m)	185 lb (84 kg)		Mount St. Mary's (Maryland)
G	13	Mike Davis	6 ft 3 in (1.91 m)	185 lb (84 kg)		Virginia Union
C	23	Leroy Ellis	6 ft 10 in (2.08 m)	210 lb (95 kg)		St. John's
G	11	Brian Heaney	6 ft 2 in (1.88 m)	180 lb (82 kg)	September 3, 1946	Acadia University
F	25	Gus Johnson	6 ft 6 in (1.98 m)	230 lb (104 kg)		Idaho
G	22	Kevin Loughery	6 ft 3 in (1.91 m)	190 lb (86 kg)		St. John's
PF	35	Ed Manning	6 ft 7 in (2.01 m)	210 lb (95 kg)	January 2, 1944	Jackson State
F	24	Jack Marin	6 ft 6 in (1.98 m)	210 lb (95 kg)		Duke
SG	15	Eddie Miles	6 ft 4 in (1.93 m)	195 lb (88 kg)	July 5, 1940	Seattle
G	10	Earl Monroe	6 ft 3 in (1.91 m)	185 lb (84 kg)		Winston-Salem State
SF	15	Bob Quick	6 ft 5 in (1.96 m)	215 lb (98 kg)	March 5, 1946	Xavier
F	31	Ray Scott	6 ft 9 in (2.06 m)	215 lb (98 kg)		Portland
SF	35	Al Tucker	6 ft 8 in (2.03 m)	190 lb (86 kg)		Oklahoma Baptist
F	41	Wes Unseld	6 ft 7 in (2.01 m)	245 lb (111 kg)		Louisville

Coaches
Head coach
- Gene Shue

Legend
- (DP) Unsigned draft pick
- (FA) Free agent
- (S) Suspended
- Injured

Roster

== Regular season ==
=== Season standings ===
Eastern Division	W	L	PCT	GB
x-New York Knicks	60	22	.732	–
x-Milwaukee Bucks	56	26	.683	4
x-Baltimore Bullets	50	32	.610	10
x-Philadelphia 76ers	42	40	.512	18
Cincinnati Royals	36	46	.439	24
Boston Celtics	34	48	.415	26
Detroit Pistons	31	51	.378	29

=== Game log ===
1969–70 game log
#	Date	Opponent	Score	High points	Record
1	October 15	Chicago	93–98	Earl Monroe (26)	1–0
2	October 18	Boston	117–124	Earl Monroe (34)	2–0
3	October 21	Los Angeles	142–137 (OT)	Kevin Loughery (35)	2–1
4	October 24	Cincinnati	126–131 (OT)	Gus Johnson (39)	3–1
5	October 25	@ New York	99–128	Earl Monroe (22)	3–2
6	October 28	@ Detroit	125–110	Kevin Loughery (33)	4–2
7	October 29	Philadelphia	129–105	Mike Davis (24)	4–3
8	October 31	N Chicago	118–109	Loughery, Marin (33)	4–4
9	November 1	Atlanta	140–137 (OT)	Gus Johnson (37)	4–5
10	November 4	San Francisco	105–124	Jack Marin (26)	5–5
11	November 5	@ Philadelphia	139–130	Loughery, Monroe (25)	6–5
12	November 7	Seattle	112–126	Earl Monroe (25)	7–5
13	November 8	@ Cincinnati	121–130	Earl Monroe (27)	7–6
14	November 9	@ Milwaukee	116–105	Kevin Loughery (27)	8–6
15	November 14	@ Boston	109–108	Earl Monroe (33)	9–6
16	November 15	Milwaukee	120–129	Kevin Loughery (43)	10–6
17	November 18	San Diego	138–142 (OT)	Mike Davis (40)	11–6
18	November 19	N Phoenix	118–133	Jack Marin (22)	12–6
19	November 21	Phoenix	116–126	Marin, Unseld (26)	13–6
20	November 23	@ Los Angeles	129–97	Earl Monroe (31)	14–6
21	November 25	@ Phoenix	134–124	Davis, Monroe (29)	15–6
22	November 27	@ San Francisco	118–116	Earl Monroe (29)	16–6
23	November 29	Boston	121–106	Mike Davis (28)	16–7
24	December 2	Cincinnati	107–129	Wes Unseld (30)	17–7
25	December 3	@ Boston	105–113	Gus Johnson (26)	17–8
26	December 5	New York	116–107	Earl Monroe (24)	17–9
27	December 6	N Seattle	132–129 (OT)	Gus Johnson (34)	17–10
28	December 8	N Chicago	122–125	Johnson, Monroe (29)	18–10
29	December 10	Phoenix	137–107	Wes Unseld (20)	18–11
30	December 12	@ Chicago	123–108	Gus Johnson (30)	19–11
31	December 13	San Diego	105–117	Earl Monroe (31)	20–11
32	December 17	@ Atlanta	138–133	Jack Marin (30)	21–11
33	December 19	Detroit	105–108	Jack Marin (23)	22–11
34	December 20	@ New York	91–128	Jackon, Marin, Unseld (14)	22–12
35	December 25	Philadelphia	113–121	Jack Marin (31)	23–12
36	December 27	San Francisco	112–147	Ellis, Johnson (22)	24–12
37	December 28	@ Milwaukee	124–133	Kevin Loughery (27)	24–13
38	December 30	Milwaukee	126–124	Earl Monroe (30)	24–14
39	December 31	@ Atlanta	111–122	Jack Marin (22)	24–15
40	January 2	Cincinnati	116–118	Earl Monroe (25)	25–15
41	January 4	@ Cincinnati	128–129	Earl Monroe (28)	25–16
42	January 6	New York	129–99	Wes Unseld (27)	25–17
43	January 7	N Detroit	116–121	Earl Monroe (28)	26–17
44	January 9	@ Boston	142–130	Wes Unseld (29)	27–17
45	January 10	Atlanta	109–130	Kevin Loughery (27)	28–17
46	January 13	@ San Diego	144–126	Kevin Loughery (35)	29–17
47	January 15	@ Phoenix	115–124	Johnson, Loughery (26)	29–18
48	January 17	@ San Diego	131–115	Jack Marin (26)	30–18
49	January 18	@ Phoenix	133–134	Kevin Loughery (34)	30–19
50	January 22	N Detroit	115–119	Monroe, Unseld (22)	31–19
51	January 23	@ Philadelphia	118–133	Earl Monroe (23)	31–20
52	January 24	Philadelphia	111–112	Gus Johnson (27)	32–20
53	January 25	@ Cincinnati	122–129	Ray Scott (28)	32–21
54	January 28	Chicago	115–123	Kevin Loughery (34)	33–21
55	January 30	@ Detroit	117–129	Kevin Loughery (35)	33–22
56	January 31	Boston	117–120	Earl Monroe (27)	34–22
57	February 1	@ Atlanta	133–124	Kevin Loughery (29)	35–22
58	February 3	Seattle	120–115	Loughery, Marin (26)	35–23
59	February 6	Detroit	148–153 (2OT)	Earl Monroe (39)	36–23
60	February 8	Milwaukee	106–120	Earl Monroe (23)	37–23
61	February 10	@ Los Angeles	111–106	Earl Monroe (27)	38–23
62	February 11	@ Seattle	117–119	Kevin Loughery (25)	38–24
63	February 13	@ Seattle	138–141	Gus Johnson (26)	38–25
64	February 16	N San Diego	109–140	Jack Marin (24)	39–25
65	February 18	Los Angeles	103–117	Earl Monroe (24)	40–25
66	February 20	Detroit	122–119	Kevin Loughery (28)	40–26
67	February 22	New York	104–110	Earl Monroe (37)	41–26
68	February 24	San Diego	118–128	Marin, Monroe (29)	42–26
69	February 25	@ Milwaukee	113–115	Earl Monroe (27)	42–27
70	February 27	Atlanta	107–114	Jack Marin (41)	43–27
71	February 28	@ New York	101–115	Carter, Monroe (23)	43–28
72	March 1	@ Philadelphia	99–104	Jack Marin (31)	43–29
73	March 2	N Cincinnati	110–118	Marin, Monroe (30)	44–29
74	March 4	Los Angeles	94–91	Jack Marin (23)	44–30
75	March 6	@ Los Angeles	105–100	Earl Monroe (29)	45–30
76	March 8	@ Seattle	109–106	Earl Monroe (31)	46–30
77	March 11	@ San Francisco	112–115 (2OT)	Earl Monroe (31)	46–31
78	March 13	@ San Francisco	114–108	Earl Monroe (30)	47–31
79	March 15	@ Boston	130–127	Earl Monroe (35)	48–31
80	March 18	Philadelphia	119–113	Earl Monroe (22)	48–32
81	March 20	@ Chicago	138–131	Jack Marin (34)	49–32
82	March 21	San Francisco	123–127	Earl Monroe (40)	50–32

== Player stats ==
Note: GP= Games played; REB= Rebounds; AST= Assists; STL = Steals; BLK = Blocks; PTS = Points; AVG = Average

Player	GP	REB	AST	STL	BLK	PTS	AVG

== Playoffs ==
In the playoffs, the Bullets were matched up against the New York Knicks for the 2nd consecutive season. After losing the first 2 games, the Bullets battled back to win the next 2 games. After the Knicks captured Game 5 in New York, the Bullets forced a 7th game with a 96–87 win at the Civic Center. However, the Bullets would fall in Game 7. The Knicks would go on to win the NBA Championship.

1970 playoff game log
Division semifinals: 3–4 (home: 2–1; road: 1–3)

Game	Date	Team	Score	High points	High rebounds	High assists	Location Attendance	Series
1	March 26	@ New York	L 117–120	Earl Monroe (39)	Wes Unseld (31)	Wes Unseld (5)	Madison Square Garden; 19,500	0–1
2	March 27	New York	L 99–106	Gus Johnson (28)	Wes Unseld (21)	Fred Carter (7)	Baltimore Civic Center; 12,289	0–2
3	March 29	@ New York	W 127–113	Earl Monroe (25)	Wes Unseld (34)	Earl Monroe (5)	Madison Square Garden; 19,500	1–2
4	March 31	New York	W 102–92	Earl Monroe (34)	Wes Unseld (24)	Fred Carter (7)	Baltimore Civic Center; 12,289	2–2
5	April 2	@ New York	L 80–101	Jack Marin (19)	Wes Unseld (15)	Jack Marin (6)	Madison Square Garden; 19,500	2–3
6	April 5	New York	W 96–87	Gus Johnson (31)	Wes Unseld (24)	Earl Monroe (5)	Baltimore Civic Center; 12,289	3–3
7	April 6	@ New York	L 114–127	Earl Monroe (32)	Wes Unseld (16)	Earl Monroe (6)	Madison Square Garden; 19,500	3–4

1970 schedule

== Awards and honors ==
- Gus Johnson, All-NBA Second Team
- Gus Johnson, NBA All-Defensive First Team
- Mike Davis, NBA All-Rookie Team 1st Team
