= Jim Zoet =

Canadian basketball player

Personal information
- Born: December 20, 1953 (age 72) Uxbridge, Ontario, Canada
- Listed height: 7 ft 1 in (2.16 m)
- Listed weight: 240 lb (109 kg)

Career information
- High school: Port Perry (Port Perry, Ontario)
- College: Kent State (1973–1976); Lakehead (1976–1978)
- NBA draft: 1978: undrafted
- Position: Centre
- Number: 34

Career history
- 1978-79: Dordtrecht Rowic
- 1979-80: Team Fiat Stars Coventry
- 1981: Guadalajara Black Knights
- 1981: Mariwasa Honda
- 1982: Detroit Pistons

Career highlights
- 2× CIAU All-Canadian (1977, 1978); CIAU Tournament All-star (1977); 2× First-team All-Great Plains (1977, 1978)
- Stats at NBA.com
- Stats at Basketball Reference

Jim Zoet (born December 20, 1953 in Uxbridge, Ontario) is a Canadian former basketball player, NBA player and member of the Canada's Olympic basketball team. He and Brian Heaney are the only Canadian University basketball players to play in an NBA game.

== Professional career ==
Zoet played for the Detroit Pistons in 1982. Zoet played in seven games for the Pistons.

Zoet also played professionally in the Netherlands, England, Argentina, Mexico, and the Philippines.

== International career ==
Zoet was a member of the Canadian national team from 1977 - 1980, including being a member of the 1980 Olympic team. Zoet unfortunately was unable to compete in these 1980 games (held in Moscow) given that Canada boycotted said Olympics as a result of the Soviet Union's invasion of Afghanistan.

This 1980 Canadian men's team was positioned to perform well in these Olympics given that Canada competed for the bronze medal in the Olympic games preceding and following these 1980 Olympics (1976, 1984) and this time in Canadian basketball has been described as "arguably the Canadian national team's greatest era" and "Canada's golden age of basketball".

Zoet competed for Canada in the 1978 FIBA World Championship and was Canada's third-leading scorer in this tournament. Canada finished 6th overall in this World Championship.

== University ==
Zoet played on scholarship for three seasons (1973–76) for Kent State University in the NCAA. Zoet then transferred to Lakehead University in the CIAU where he played for the next two seasons (1976–1978). He was named an CIAU All-Canadian both of these seasons, where he averaged 19 points per game. He was also named as a Great Plains First Team All-Star these two seasons.

In the 1977 season, he led Lakehead to the CIAU national championship game, the first of two times Lakehead has reached the national championship game. This year he was named as a CIAU Tournament All-Star.

== Post career ==
Zoet was inducted into the Canada Basketball Hall of Fame (2015) and the Lakehead University Sports Wall of Fame (2009). In 2015, the 1976-77 Lakehead men's basketball team was inducted into the Lakehead Sports Wall of Fame, of which Zoet was a crucial member.

== Career statistics ==
Legend
GP	Games played	GS	Games started	MPG	Minutes per game
FG%	Field goal percentage	3P%	3-point field goal percentage	FT%	Free throw percentage
RPG	Rebounds per game	APG	Assists per game	SPG	Steals per game
BPG	Blocks per game	PPG	Points per game	**Bold**	Career high

=== NBA ===
==== Regular season ====
Year	Team	GP	GS	MPG	FG%	3P%	FT%	RPG	APG	SPG	BPG	PPG
1982–83	Detroit	7	0	4.3	.200	–	–	1.1	.1	.1	.4	.3
