= Mike Davis (basketball, born 1946) =

American basketball player

Personal information
- Born: July 26, 1946 (age 80) Brooklyn, New York, U.S.
- Listed height: 6 ft 3 in (1.91 m)
- Listed weight: 183 lb (83 kg)

Career information
- High school: Eastern District (Brooklyn, New York)
- College: Virginia Union (1965–1969)
- NBA draft: 1969: 1st round, 14th overall pick
- Drafted by: Baltimore Bullets
- Playing career: 1969–1973
- Position: Shooting guard
- Number: 13, 32, 20

Career history
- 1969–1970: Baltimore Bullets
- 1970–1972: Buffalo Braves
- 1972: Baltimore Bullets
- 1972–1973: Memphis Tams

Career highlights
- NBA All-Rookie First Team (1970)

Career NBA and ABA statistics
- Points: 2,443 (10.1 ppg)
- Rebounds: 511 (2.1 rpg)
- Assists: 412 (2.7 apg)
- Stats at NBA.com
- Stats at Basketball Reference

Michael A. Davis (born July 26, 1946) is a retired American basketball player in the National Basketball Association (NBA) and American Basketball Association (ABA).

Davis was selected by the Baltimore Bullets in the first round of the 1967 NBA draft and by the Oakland Oaks in the 1967 ABA Draft.

Named to the 1970 NBA All-Rookie Team, he played from 1969 to 1973 as a member of the Baltimore Bullets, Buffalo Braves, and Memphis Tams.

== Career statistics ==
Legend
GP	Games played	GS	Games started	MPG	Minutes per game
FG%	Field goal percentage	3P%	3-point field goal percentage	FT%	Free throw percentage
RPG	Rebounds per game	APG	Assists per game	SPG	Steals per game
BPG	Blocks per game	PPG	Points per game	**Bold**	Career high

=== NBA/ABA ===
==== Regular season ====
Year	Team	GP	MPG	FG%	3P%	FT%	RPG	APG	PPG
1969–70	Baltimore	56	**23.8**	**.444**		.776	2.3	2.0	**11.9**
1970–71	Buffalo	**73**	22.2	.410		.760	2.6	**2.1**	11.4
1971–72	Buffalo	62	17.2	.425		.767	1.9	1.3	9.1
1972–73	Baltimore	13	21.8	.424		**.920**	**2.7**	1.5	9.5
1972–73	Memphis (ABA)	38	14.6	.419	.261	.713	1.1	1.2	6.7
Career (NBA)		204	21.1	.424		.772	2.3	1.8	10.7
Career (overall)		242	20.0	.424	.261	.765	2.1	1.7	10.1
