= Ray Scott (basketball) =

American basketball player and coach (born 1938)

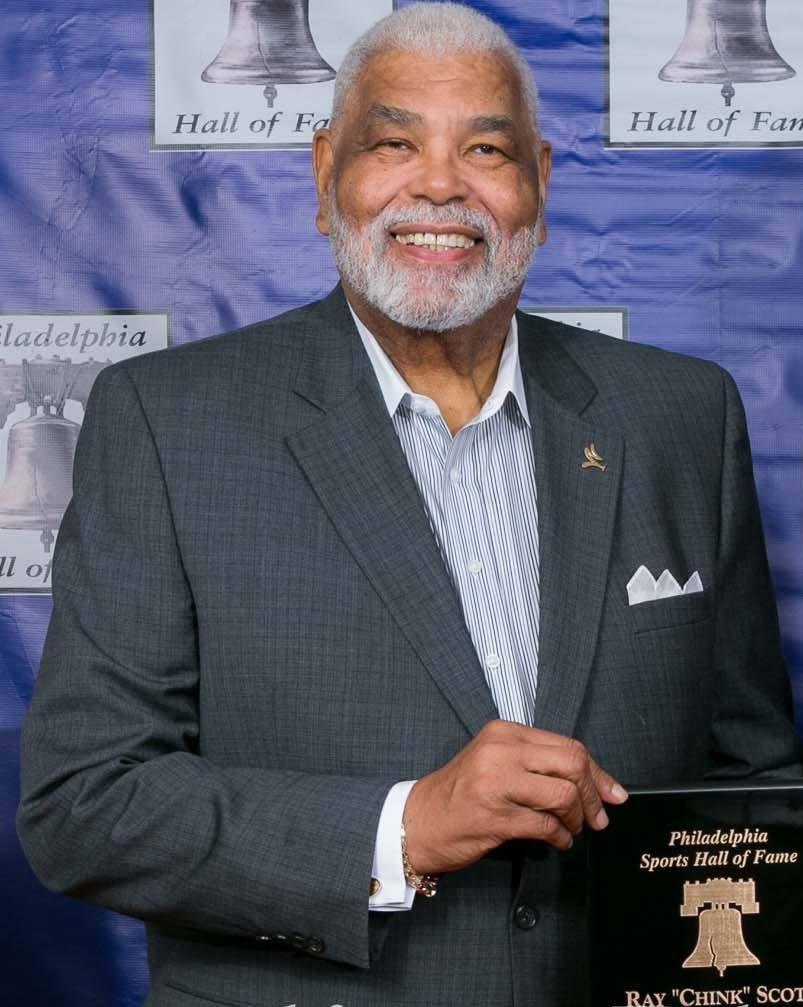

Personal information
- Born: July 12, 1938 (age 88) Philadelphia, Pennsylvania, U.S.
- Listed height: 6 ft 9 in (2.06 m)
- Listed weight: 215 lb (98 kg)

Career information
- High school: West Philadelphia (Philadelphia, Pennsylvania)
- College: Portland (1957–1958)
- NBA draft: 1961: 1st round, 4th overall pick
- Drafted by: Detroit Pistons
- Playing career: 1958–1972
- Position: Power forward / center
- Number: 22, 12, 31

Career history

Playing
- 1958–1961: Allentown Jets
- 1961–1967: Detroit Pistons
- 1967–1970: Baltimore Bullets
- 1970–1972: Virginia Squires

Coaching
- 1972–1976: Detroit Pistons
- 1976–1979: Eastern Michigan

Career highlights
- As player: All-EPBL First Team (1961); All-EPBL Second Team (1960); As coach: NBA Coach of the Year (1974)

Career NBA and ABA statistics
- Points: 11,269 (14.3 ppg)
- Rebounds: 7,979 (9.8 rpg)
- Assists: 1,781 (2.2 apg)
- Stats at NBA.com
- Stats at Basketball Reference

John Raymond Scott (born July 12, 1938) is an American former professional basketball player and coach. He played twelve seasons in professional basketball, ten in the National Basketball Association (NBA) with the Detroit Pistons and Baltimore Bullets, and two with the Virginia Squires of the American Basketball Association (ABA). After he retired from playing basketball, he was selected an assistant coach of the Pistons by Earl Lloyd. Seven games into the 1972–73 season, Lloyd was fired, and Scott was chosen to replace him as the head coach. In his first full season in 1973–74, the Pistons won 52 games that saw them reach the postseason for the first time in six years. He was named the NBA Coach of the Year, the first African-American to win the honor and the only one until 1991. The Pistons made the postseason two times in Scott's coaching career before he was fired 42 games into the 1975–76 season. He later coached at Eastern Michigan University from 1976 to 1979 before becoming an insurance executive for three decades.

== Early life ==
Scott was born on July 12, 1938, in Philadelphia, Pennsylvania. He attended West Philadelphia High School, where he excelled in basketball. He competed against future NBA Hall of Fame great Wilt Chamberlain, who was a year ahead of Scott at Philadelphia's Overbrook High School, also located in West Philadelphia. Like Chamberlain, he was hired as a teenager by Haskell Cohen to work and play basketball at Kutscher's Hotel, a resort located in the Catskill Mountains. At Kutscher's, Scott was also in close regular contact with Hall of Fame Boston Celtics' basketball coach Red Auerbach. He played basketball at Kutscher's under Auerbach's tutelage. Scott also played in summer basketball leagues in Philadelphia and Washington, D.C.

In Scott's opinion, NBA Hall of Fame center Bill Russell was the cornerstone of the Boston Celtics championship teams, and Wilt Chamberlain was the cornerstone of the NBA. Scott later said that Auerbach, Earl Lloyd, Red Holzman and Marty Blake were the four people most responsible for bringing black players into the NBA in significant numbers.

He played against Chamberlain three times during the 1954-55 season, West Philadelphia's only three losses that season. While Chamberlain scored at least 32 points in his games against Scott that season, Scott also scored over 20 points in each of those games.

In 1955, Overbrook and West Philadelphia High played in the Philadelphia Public League Championship Game at the Palestra before 8,500 people, with Overbrook and Chamberlain winning against Scott's Speedboys 78–60. Scott and West Philadelphia won the Public League championship the following season (1955-56) against Northeast High by the same score, with Scott scoring 22 points in the game, after averaging 31.7 points per game for the year. West Philadelphia came in second among all Philadelphia high schools that year in the city-wide high school basketball tournament. He was the Public League's top scorer and most valuable player; and was a unanimous All-State selection his senior year.

== College career ==
Scott finished high school in January 1957, and was pursued by colleges offering basketball scholarships. The Harlem Globetrotters had approached Scott in high school, but he had no interest in joining them. Knowing he needed to bolster his academic standing before entering college, he enrolled at New York City Junior College (NYCJC) in January 1957. He played in 10 games on the NYCJC basketball team, averaging 24 points per game; and led NYCJC to a conference championship, scoring 35 points in the championship game against Broome College of Binghampton, New York.

Scott next attended the University of Portland for one school year (1957-58), after receiving 75 scholarship offers coming out of high school. Friends of Portland head coach Al Negratti had interested Scott in coming to Portland, after his semester at NYCJC. Because he had played that one semester with NYCJC, the National Association of Intercollegiate Athletics (NAIA) ruled that Scott could not play for Portland's basketball team during his first semester at Portland (1957).

Once allowed to play, in February 1958 Scott scored 28 points in his first game, playing against Seattle University and its future Hall of Fame star player Elgin Baylor, who scored 60 points in that game. When asked if he considered Baylor the greatest player he had ever faced, Scott said Baylor was second to Chamberlain; but a close second. A few weeks later Scott scored 31 points in a game against Gonzaga, and held its 7 ft 3.25 in (2.22 m) center Jean Claude Lefebvre in check defensively, after Lefebvre had just scored 50 points in a game one week earlier. Unlike most big front court players, Scott had the agility, dribbling and movement skills of a guard, and a good jump shot from the outside. He had learned to play outside, away for the basket, from playing against Chamberlain.

Portland had a 16–10 record and made it to the 1958 NAIA basketball championship tournament, but lost to Coe College, 63–61, in the first round. Scott led Portland with 19 points in the game. Scott played in 13 games as a freshman, averaging 20.3 points and 11.4 rebounds per game. Negratti believed Scott had the ability and attitude to grow into a great player. However, Scott played only one year at Portland under Negratti. The NAIA ruled two Portland players, including Scott, were academically ineligible to play during the 1958-59 school year. Scott then left Portland at the beginning of his sophomore year, and signed to play professional basketball with a farm team of the New York Knicks.

== Professional career ==
=== Allentown Jets (1958–1961) ===
Scott played for the Allentown Jets of the Eastern Professional Basketball League (EPBL) from 1958 to 1961. In the 1960–1961 season, he averaged 33.5 points and 16.4 rebounds a game. He averaged 23.4 points and 12.1 rebounds a game in the 1959–1960 season. Scott was selected to the All-EPBL First Team in 1961 and Second Team in 1960.

=== Detroit Pistons (1961–1967) ===
After being scouted by Earl Lloyd, who had been the league's first black player and became a mentor to Scott, Scott was selected with the fourth pick of the 1961 NBA draft by the Detroit Pistons. Scott played for the Pistons from 1961 to 1967. He was skilled at shooting near the perimeter of the court. He averaged 16.0 points and 10.7 rebounds a game during his Pistons career. He averaged 11.5 rebounds per game in 1961-62 (11th best in the NBA), 10.2 in 1962-63 (12th best in the NBA) and 13.5 rebounds per game in 1963-64 (7th best in the NBA). His best all-around season with the Pistons came in 1963-64, when he averaged 17.6 points and 3.1 assists in addition to 13.5 rebounds per game. His 17.9 points per game with the Pistons in 1965-66 was his career-high.

He never played for a winning team in Detroit. He played alongside Hall of Fame forwards Bailey Howell (1961-64) and Dave DeBusschere (1962-67) with the Pistons; and all of one season and part of another (1965-67) under DeBusschere as the Pistons' head coach. He played 45 games for the Pistons in 1966-67, averaging 14.7 points and nine rebounds per game before being traded in early 1967.

=== Baltimore Bullets (1967–1970) ===
In January 1967, Scott was part of a three-team trade involving the Pistons, the Baltimore Bullets and the Los Angeles Lakers. The Bullets traded center Mel Counts to Los Angeles, Los Angeles traded Rudy LaRusso to the Bullets who then immediately traded LaRusso to the Pistons for Scott. The Bullets had a 20–61 record that season. Scott played in 27 games for the Bullets, averaging 19 points and 13.2 rebounds per game, playing alongside future Hall of Fame forward Gus Johnson. Scott would become close friends with Johnson.

He was a starting forward for the Bullets in 1967-68, averaging 16.4 points and 13.7 rebounds per game. In addition to Johnson, the team now included Rookie of the Year and future Hall of Fame guard (and fellow Philadelphian) Earl Monroe. Scott once said that no one, human or divine, could go one-on-one with Monroe. The Bullets record improved to 36–46.

The following season, the 1968-69 Rookie of the Year and NBA Most Valuable Player, future Hall of Fame center Wes Unseld joined the Bullets. The Bullets had a 57–25 record, finishing first in the NBA's Eastern Division. This was the first team Scott had ever played on that had a winning record. He played in all 82 games, but had a reduced role, averaging 11.8 points and 8.8 rebounds in 26.4 minutes per game. He was backup to starting forwards Jack Marin and Gus Johnson, but had to step up when Johnson's season was finished in early February 1969 with a knee injury. Scott started all four games in Johnson's place for the Bullets in their four game playoff loss to the New York Knicks, averaging 13.3 points and eight rebounds per game.

In 1969-70, Scott was a reserve forward, averaging 8.9 points and 6.3 rebounds in 19.1 minutes per game. The Bullets finished 52–30, but lost to the Knicks four games to three in the first round of the 1970 NBA playoffs. Scott played in all seven playoff games, averaging 4.6 points and three rebounds in nearly 13 minutes per game.

After the 1970 season, the Bullets left Scott exposed in the 1970 expansion draft, and he was selected by the Buffalo Braves.

During his Bullets' career, in one game against the Boston Celtics he grabbed 28 rebounds playing against Bill Russell. He also had a 27-point, 26-rebound game against the St. Louis Hawks, and a 30-point, 20-rebound game the first time playing against the Pistons after they traded him. Scott gave Bullets' teammate and fellow Philadelphian Freddie "Mad Dog" Carter his nickname, after Carter once bit Scott during a one-on-one practice drill.

=== Virginia Squires (1970–1972) ===
Although Scott was selected by the Buffalo Braves in the 1970 expansion draft, he instead chose to play for the American Basketball Association's Virginia Squires. The Braves brought legal action in United States District Court, seeking a preliminary injunction to prevent Scott from joining the Squires, saying Scott was under contract to the Braves, which Scott and the Squires disputed. Judge Richard B. Kellam ruled against the Braves, denying the preliminary injunction request. Scott went on to play the final two years of his professional career with the Squires from 1970 to 1972, where he was a teammate of Julius Erving.

Scott split center duties with Jim Eakins in 1970-71, averaging 14.3 points and eight rebounds in only 21.6 minutes per game. He was 12th in the ABA's Most Valuable Player voting. In the 1971 ABA playoffs, over 12 games in two rounds, he averaged 17.3 points and 6.5 rebounds in only 22 minutes per game. In his final season, 1971-72, he was back at reserve forward; averaging 7.6 points and 4.6 rebounds in nearly 15 minutes per game. In two rounds of the 1972 ABA playoffs, he played in 11 games, averaging 12 points and 5.3 rebounds in 19.3 minutes per game.

Scott retired in 1972 at age 34.

=== Union activity ===
Scott was among the group of players who worked to form an NBA players union under the leadership of Oscar Robertson.

== Coaching career ==
=== Detroit Pistons (1972–1976) ===
Scott’s mentor Earl Lloyd became the Pistons head coach in 1971. After Scott retired in 1972 he had joined the Squires front office, but left for Detroit when Lloyd asked Scott to join the Pistons as an assistant coach. To Scott's surprise, he was promoted from assistant to head coach of the Pistons on October 28, 1972, succeeding Lloyd who was fired after a 2–5 start. Under his direction, the ballclub went 38–37 for the remainder of the 1972–73 campaign. The next season, Scott received the NBA Coach of the Year Award and become the first black man to win NBA coach of the year after guiding the Pistons to a then-franchise-best 52–30 regular season record in 1973–74. The Pistons lost in the Western Conference semifinal playoff series against the Chicago Bulls, four games to three; losing Game 7, 96–94. The team slumped to 40–42 in 1974–75. Scott was dismissed and replaced on January 26, 1976, by assistant Herb Brown, when the Pistons record was 17–25.

=== Eastern Michigan (1976–1979) ===
Scott was appointed men's basketball head coach at Eastern Michigan University just over six weeks later on March 10, 1976. Over three seasons, he guided EMU to a 29–52 record. Eastern Michigan fired Scott in March 1979, with Scott saying at the time the decision to part ways was mutual. Scott later said becoming Eastern Michigan's coach was a mistake, because he lacked knowledge about how to effectively recruit high school players.

== Honors ==
Scott received the NBA Coach of the Year Award for the 1973-74 season. In February 2008, Scott was inducted into the Michigan Sports Hall of Fame. In April 2008, during a celebration of the Pistons' 50th anniversary, he was named one of the "30 All-Time Pistons". In November 2017, Scott was inducted into the Philadelphia Black Basketball Hall of Fame, in its inaugural class. Scott is also a co-founder. He also was inducted into the Philadelphia Sports Hall of Fame in 2017.

== Personal life ==
After his coaching career, Scott went into private business, spending 30 years as an insurance executive. He also has held the position of ambassador for children and families for the Wellspring Lutheran service agency in Michigan.

Scott married Jennifer Ziehm on June 27, 1981. They met during his coaching of the men's basketball team at Eastern Michigan University in Ypsilanti. Together they share three daughters; Allison, Devon, and Nia. Ray also has a fourth daughter named Maria. Ray coached two of his daughters in grade school basketball for the Ann Arbor St. Paul Lutheran School Lady Crusaders. He stated, "The happiest five years I spent coaching were at St. Paul’s in Ann Arbor with my girls". He coached there for almost a decade, and claimed that it was his most satisfying experience in basketball. "Coaching my girls was one of the most fulfilling feelings [I] could ever have in life. Just coaching my girls." He still resides with his wife Jennifer on Michigan's East Side. Scott observed that in the perceptions of others he is always perceived as a black man, but his wife Jennifer is only perceived as white when she is with him.

On June 14, 2022, at nearly 84-years old, Scott published and released his first book, a memoir he co-wrote with Charley Rosen. It is an autobiographical piece that reflects on racism and segregation he faced in the 1960s and 70s, and how it affected his NBA career NBA. The book title is The NBA in Black and White: The Memoir of a Trailblazing NBA Player and Coach. Rosen, a basketball historian who died in September 2025, said that of the 27 books in which he was involved as an author, this was his most important.

== Career statistics ==
Legend
GP	Games played	GS	Games started	MPG	Minutes per game
FG%	Field goal percentage	3P%	3-point field goal percentage	FT%	Free throw percentage
RPG	Rebounds per game	APG	Assists per game	SPG	Steals per game
BPG	Blocks per game	PPG	Points per game	**Bold**	Career high
*	Led the league

=== NBA/ABA ===
==== Regular season ====
Year	Team	GP	MPG	FG%	3P%	FT%	RPG	APG	PPG
1961–62	Detroit	75	27.8	.387		.657	11.5	1.8	13.3
1962–63	Detroit	76	33.4	.414		.674	10.2	2.5	16.2
1963–64	Detroit	80	**37.1**	.412		.719	13.5	3.1	17.6
1964–65	Detroit	66	32.8	.368		.701	9.6	**3.6**	15.5
1965–66	Detroit	79	33.6	.416		.743	9.6	3.0	17.9
1966–67	Detroit	45	32.8	.370		.757	9.0	1.9	14.7
1966–67	Baltimore	27	35.9	.445		.625	13.2	2.8	**19.0**
1967–68	Baltimore	81	36.1	.412		.779	**13.7**	2.1	16.4
1968–69	Baltimore	**82**	26.4	.416		.659	8.8	1.6	11.8
1969–70	Baltimore	73	19.1	.425		**.803**	6.3	1.6	8.9
1970–71	Virginia (ABA)	72	21.6	**.450**	**1.000**	.792	8.0	1.7	14.3
1971–72	Virginia (ABA)	55	14.9	.415	.500	.781	4.6	.7	7.6
Career (NBA)		684	31.2	.405		.720	10.5	2.4	14.9
Career (ABA)		127	18.7	.440	.600	.789	6.5	1.3	11.4
Career (overall)		811	29.2	.409	.600	.727	9.8	2.2	14.3

==== Playoffs ====
Year	Team	GP	MPG	FG%	3P%	FT%	RPG	APG	PPG
1962	Detroit	10	**40.0**	.406		.522	**14.5**	**4.3**	**17.3**
1963	Detroit	4	38.8	.351		.692	12.0	2.3	15.8
1969	Baltimore	4	34.3	.442		**.875**	8.0	1.0	13.3
1970	Baltimore	7	12.9	.324		.714	3.0	.6	4.6
1971	Virginia (ABA)	**12**	22.0	**.510**	–	.839	6.5	1.8	**17.3**
1972	Virginia (ABA)	11	19.3	.495	–	.737	5.3	1.5	12.0
Career (NBA)		25	31.3	.390		.598	9.8	2.4	12.8
Career (ABA)		23	20.7	.504	–	.798	5.9	1.7	14.7
Career (overall)		48	26.2	.440	–	.694	8.0	2.0	13.8

== Head coaching record ==
Legend
Regular season	G	Games coached	W	Games won	L	Games lost	W–L %	Win–loss %
Playoffs	PG	Playoff games	PW	Playoff wins	PL	Playoff losses	PW–L %	Playoff win–loss %

=== NBA ===
Team	Year	G	W	L	W–L%	Finish	PG	PW	PL	PW–L%	Result
Detroit	1972–73	75	38	37	.507	3rd in Midwest	—	—	—	—	Missed playoffs
Detroit	1973–74	82	52	30	.634	3rd in Midwest	7	3	4	.429	Lost in Conference semifinals
Detroit	1974–75	82	40	42	.488	3rd in Midwest	3	1	2	.333	Lost in First round
Detroit	1975–76	42	17	25	.405	(fired)	—	—	—	—	
Career		281	147	134	.523		10	4	6	.400	
