= Brian Heaney =

American basketball player and coach

Personal information
- Born: September 3, 1946 (age 80)
- Listed height: 6 ft 2 in (1.88 m)
- Listed weight: 180 lb (82 kg)

Career information
- High school: Bishop Loughlin Memorial (Brooklyn, New York)
- College: Acadia (1964–1969)
- NBA draft: 1969: 19th round, 215th overall pick
- Drafted by: Baltimore Bullets
- Playing career: 1969–1971
- Position: Guard
- Number: 11

Career history
- 1969–1970: Baltimore Bullets
- 1969–1971: Sunbury Mercuries

Career statistics
- Points: 28 (2.0 ppg)
- Assists: 6 (0.4 apg)
- Games played: 14
- Stats at NBA.com
- Stats at Basketball Reference

Brian Patrick Heaney (born September 3, 1946) is an American former professional basketball player and coach. He spent one season in the National Basketball Association (NBA) as a member of the Baltimore Bullets during the 1969–70 season.

== Career ==
=== Player ===
Heaney attended Bishop Loughlin Memorial High School in Brooklyn, New York, before enrolling at Acadia University in Canada in 1964. He helped the Axemen win the 1965 Canadian University Men's Basketball National Championships. Heaney earned CIS Tournament All-Star Team honors in 1965 and 1966 and was a First Team All-Canadian in 1969. He set a single-game scoring record of 74 points.

He was drafted by the Baltimore Bullets in the 19^{th} round of the 1969 NBA draft from Acadia University. Heaney was the first CIAU player to play in the NBA and along with Jim Zoet, are the only two U Sports players to have played in an NBA game. He split the 1969–70 season between the Bullets, scoring a total of 30 points in the NBA, and the Sunbury Mercuries of the Eastern League. He returned to the Mercuries for the 1970–71 season.

=== Coach ===
In 1971, he was named head men's basketball coach at Saint Mary's University in Halifax, Nova Scotia. Under his guidance, the Huskies won national titles in 1973, 1978 and 1979. Heaney was the recipient of the Stuart W. Aberdeen Memorial Trophy as CIS Coach of the Year in 1973. In 1975, Heaney became the head coach of Canada's Women's National Team and took the squad to the 1976 Olympic Games, before returning to Saint Mary's in 1977. He served as head coach until 1979. During his seven-year tenure as the Huskies' head coach, Heaney had a record of 87 wins and 21 losses.

After working as head coach of the University of Alberta men's basketball team from 1979 to 1983 and of the University of Toronto men's basketball team from 1983 to 1985, Heaney took a job in the financial services sector and became a CIS and NBA broadcaster. In 2002, he served as Honorary Chairman of the CIS Men's Championship. From 2007 to 2010, Heaney was the athletic director at Acadia University and then returned to his business job and broadcasting.

=== Sportscaster ===
During the 2000s, Heaney also served as a studio analyst for TSN on their Toronto Raptors NBA broadcasts.

== Honours ==
Heaney is a member of the Canadian Basketball Hall of Fame, Nova Scotia Sport Hall of Fame and the Acadia Sports Hall of Fame.

== Career statistics ==
Legend
GP	Games played	GS	Games started	MPG	Minutes per game
FG%	Field goal percentage	3P%	3-point field goal percentage	FT%	Free throw percentage
RPG	Rebounds per game	APG	Assists per game	SPG	Steals per game
BPG	Blocks per game	PPG	Points per game	**Bold**	Career high

=== NBA ===
==== Regular season ====
Year	Team	GP	MPG	FG%	FT%	RPG	APG	PPG
1969–70	Baltimore	14	5.0	.542	.500	.3	.4	2.0

==== Playoffs ====
Year	Team	GP	MPG	FG%	FT%	RPG	APG	PPG
1970	Baltimore	6	1.2	.000	–	.2	.2	.0
