= NBA All-Rookie Team =

National Basketball Association honor

The NBA All-Rookie Team is an annual National Basketball Association (NBA) honor given since the 1962–63 NBA season to the top rookies during the regular season. Voting is conducted by the NBA head coaches who are not allowed to vote for players on their own team. The All-Rookie Team is generally composed of two five-man lineups: a first team and a second team. The players each receive two points for each first team vote and one point for each second team vote. The top five players with the highest point total make the first team, with the next five making the second team. In the case of a tie at the fifth position of either team, the roster is expanded. If the first team consists of six players due to a tie, the second team will still consist of five players with the potential for more expansion in the event of additional ties. Ties have occurred several times, most recently in 2012, when Kawhi Leonard, Iman Shumpert, and Brandon Knight tied in votes received. No respect is given to positions. For example, the first team had four forwards, and one guard in 2008, while the first team had four centers (two of which were forward-centers) and one guard in 2016.

The Chicago Bulls hold the record for franchise with the most All-Rookie Team selections, with 26. The Detroit Pistons and Washington Wizards are tied for second, with 23 players selected from each franchise. Nine All-Rookie Team members have won both the Rookie of the Year Award and the Most Valuable Player Award (MVP) during their careers. Wilt Chamberlain and Wes Unseld are the only players to accomplish this feat in the same season. As of the end of the 2023–24 season, 69 members of the All-Rookie Team have been elected into the Naismith Memorial Basketball Hall of Fame, 77 members were not from the United States, and 118 members are active in the NBA.

== Selections ==
^	Denotes player who is still active in the NBA
*	Elected to Naismith Memorial Basketball Hall of Fame as player
†	Not yet eligible for Hall of Fame consideration (Note: A player is not eligible for induction into the Naismith Memorial Basketball Hall of Fame until he has been fully retired for two calendar years.)
§	1st time eligible for Hall of Fame in 2027
**Player** (in bold text)	Indicates player who won Rookie of the Year award
Team (#)	Denotes number of times a player from team has won
Player (in italic text)	Indicates player who was drafted first overall

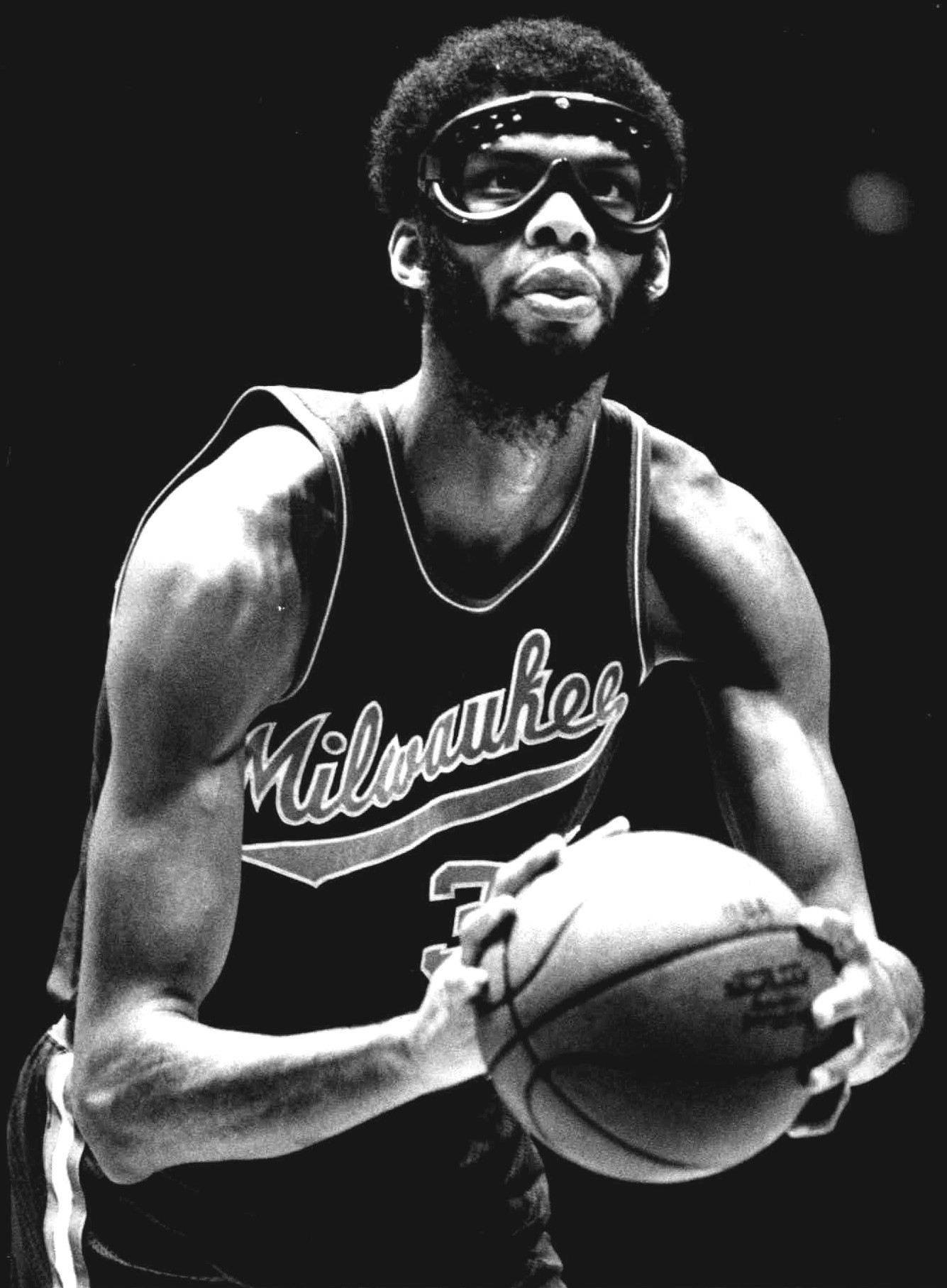
Kareem Abdul-Jabbar (as Lew Alcindor) was named to the All-Rookie Team in the 1969–70 NBA season.

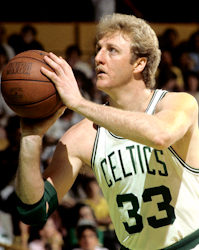
Larry Bird was named to the All-Rookie Team in the 1979–80 NBA season.

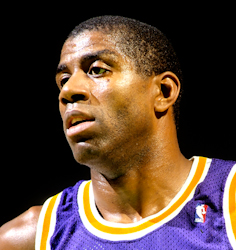
Magic Johnson was named to the All-Rookie Team in the 1979–80 NBA season.

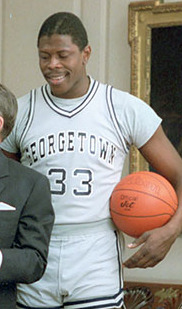
Patrick Ewing was named to the All-Rookie Team in the 1985–86 NBA season.

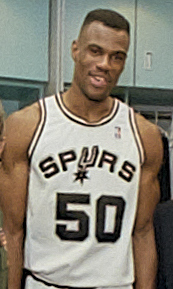
David Robinson was named to the All-Rookie First Team in the 1989–90 NBA season.

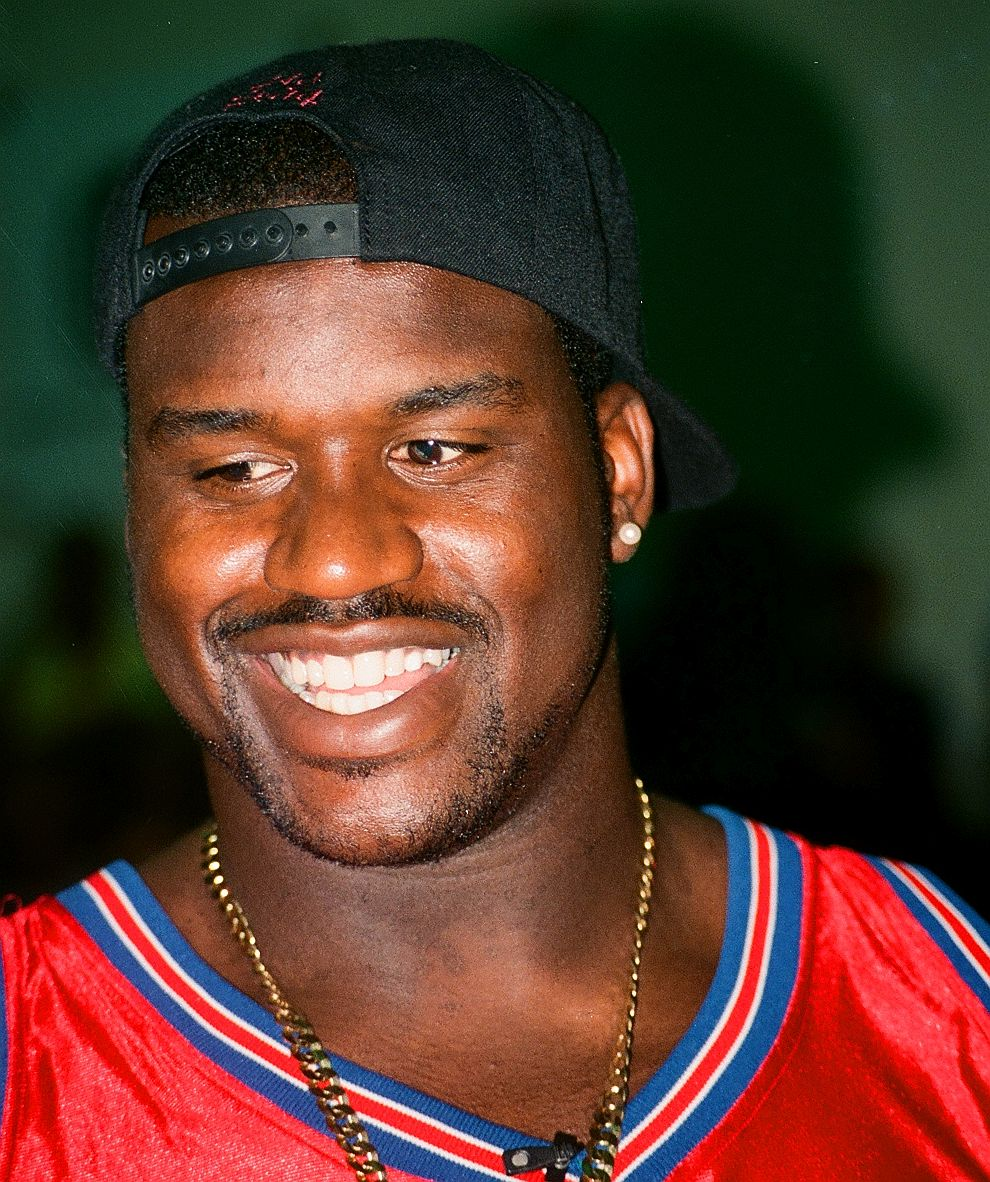
Shaquille O'Neal was named to the All-Rookie First Team in the 1992–93 NBA season.

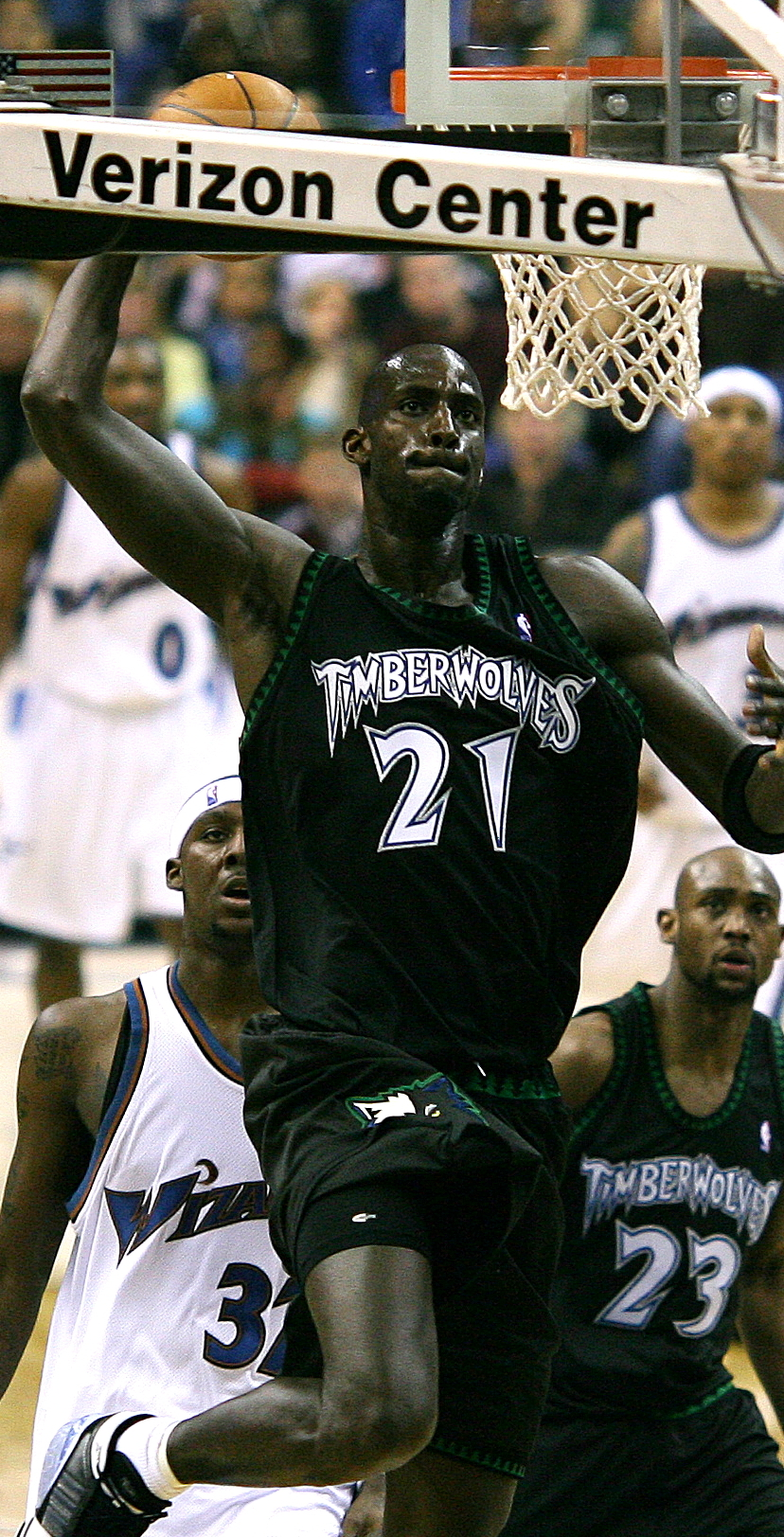
Kevin Garnett was named to the All-Rookie Second Team in the 1995–96 NBA season.

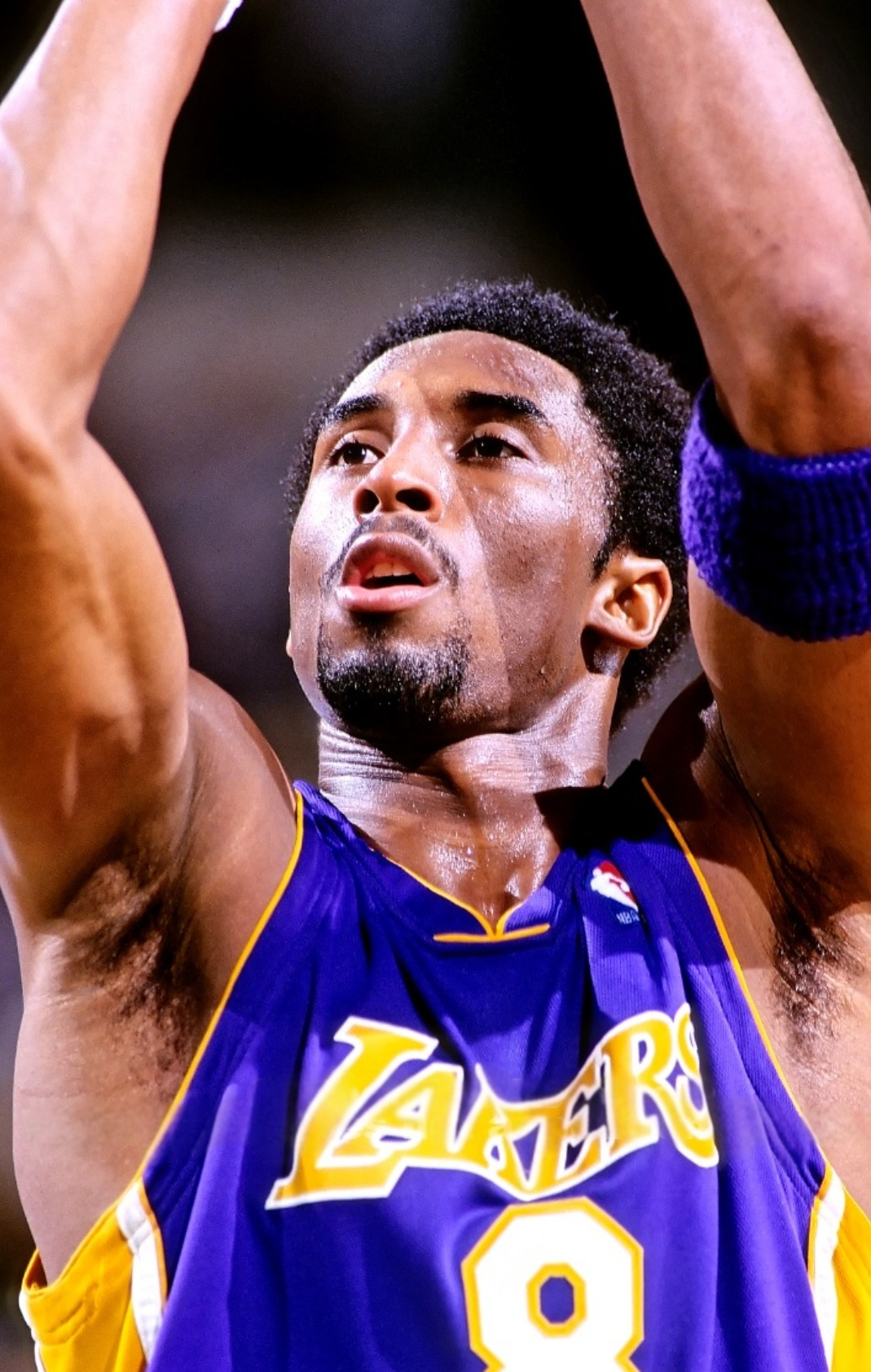
Kobe Bryant was named to the All-Rookie Second Team in the 1996–97 NBA season.

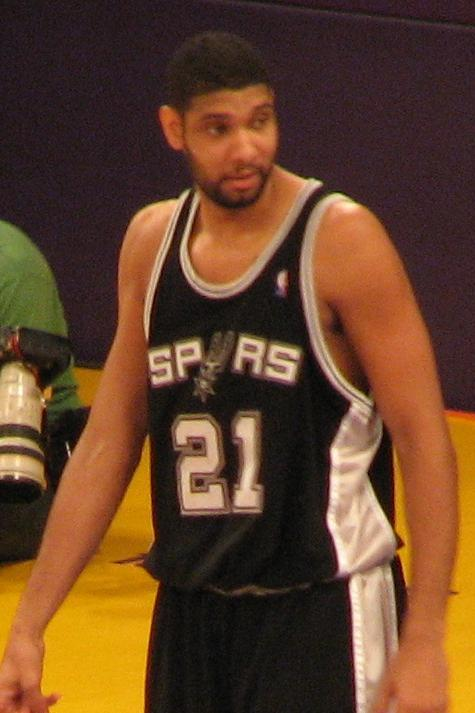
Tim Duncan was named to the All-Rookie First Team in the 1997–98 NBA season.

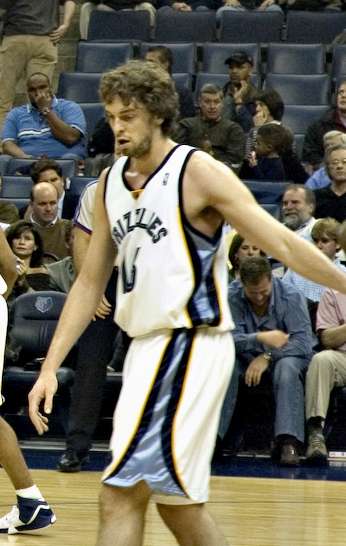
Pau Gasol was named to the All-Rookie First Team in the 2001–02 NBA season.

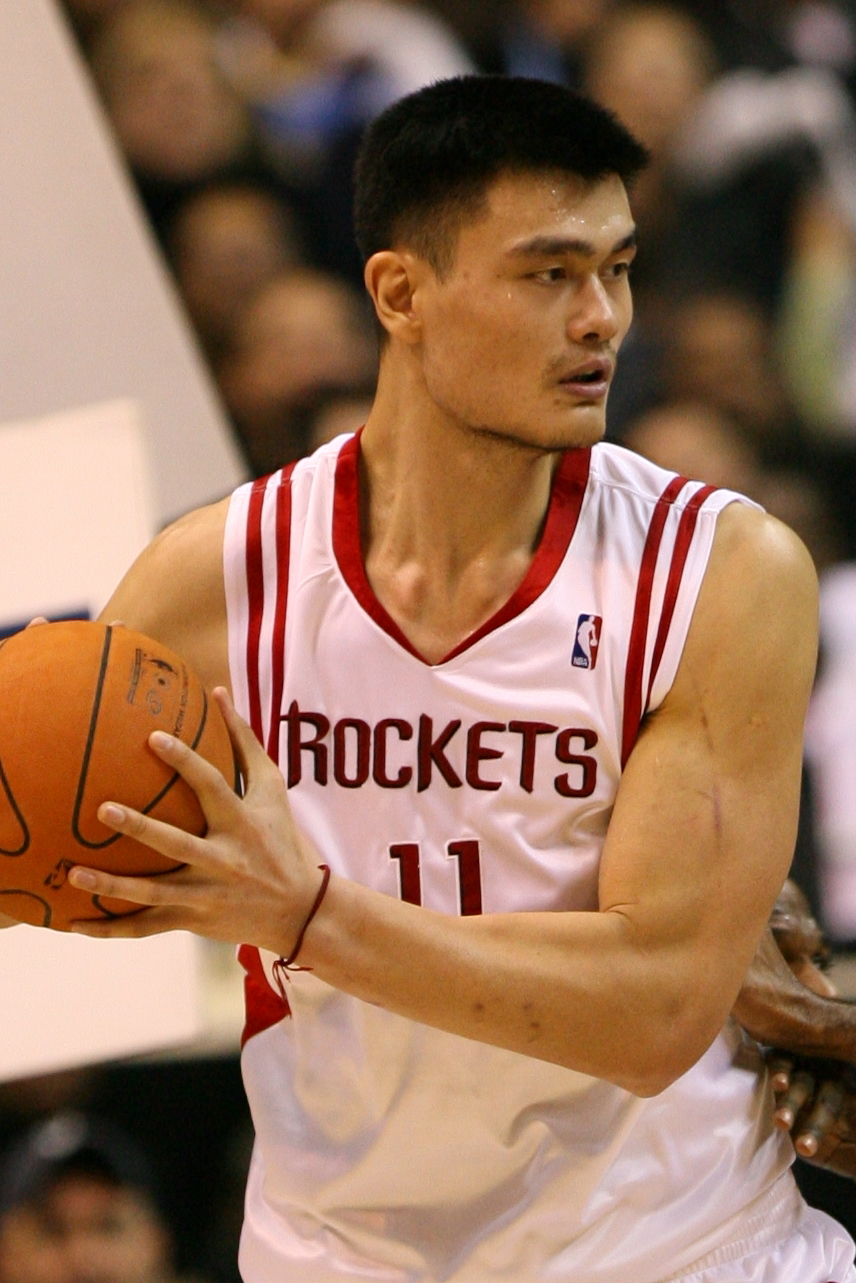
Yao Ming was named to the All-Rookie First Team in the 2002–03 NBA season.

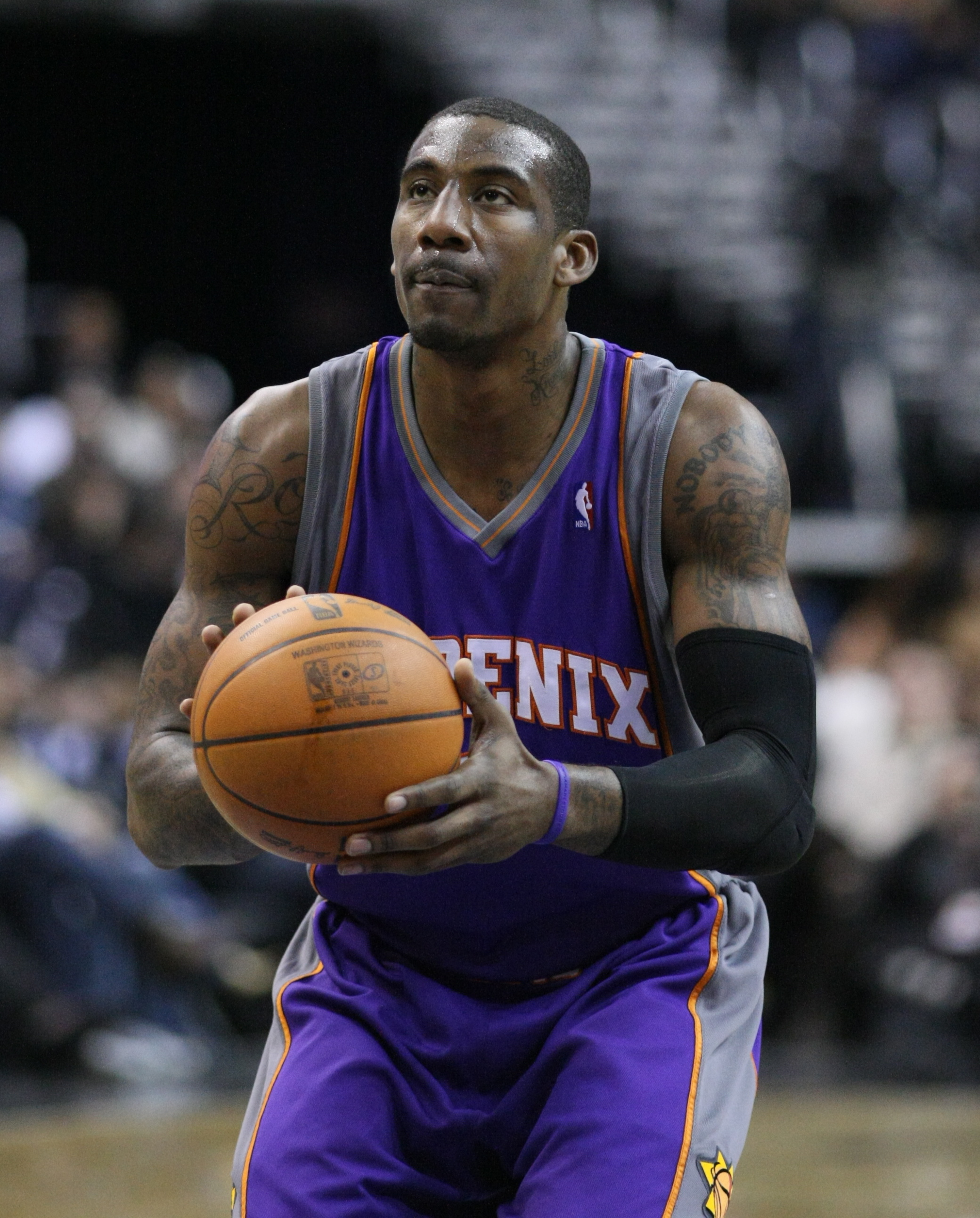
Amar'e Stoudemire was named to the All-Rookie First Team in the 2002–03 NBA season.

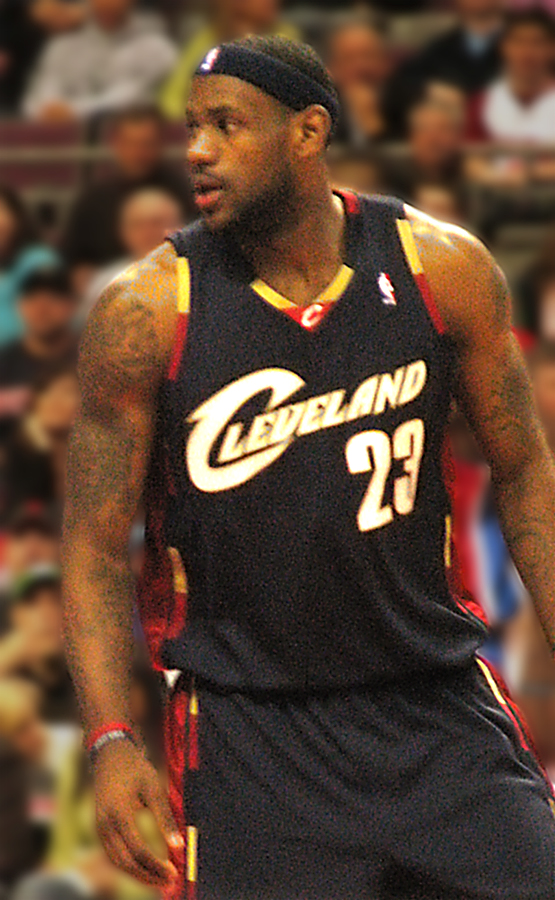
LeBron James was named to the All-Rookie First Team in the 2003–04 NBA season.

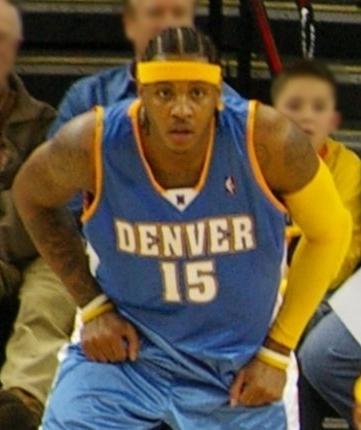
Carmelo Anthony was named to the All-Rookie First Team in the 2003–04 NBA season.

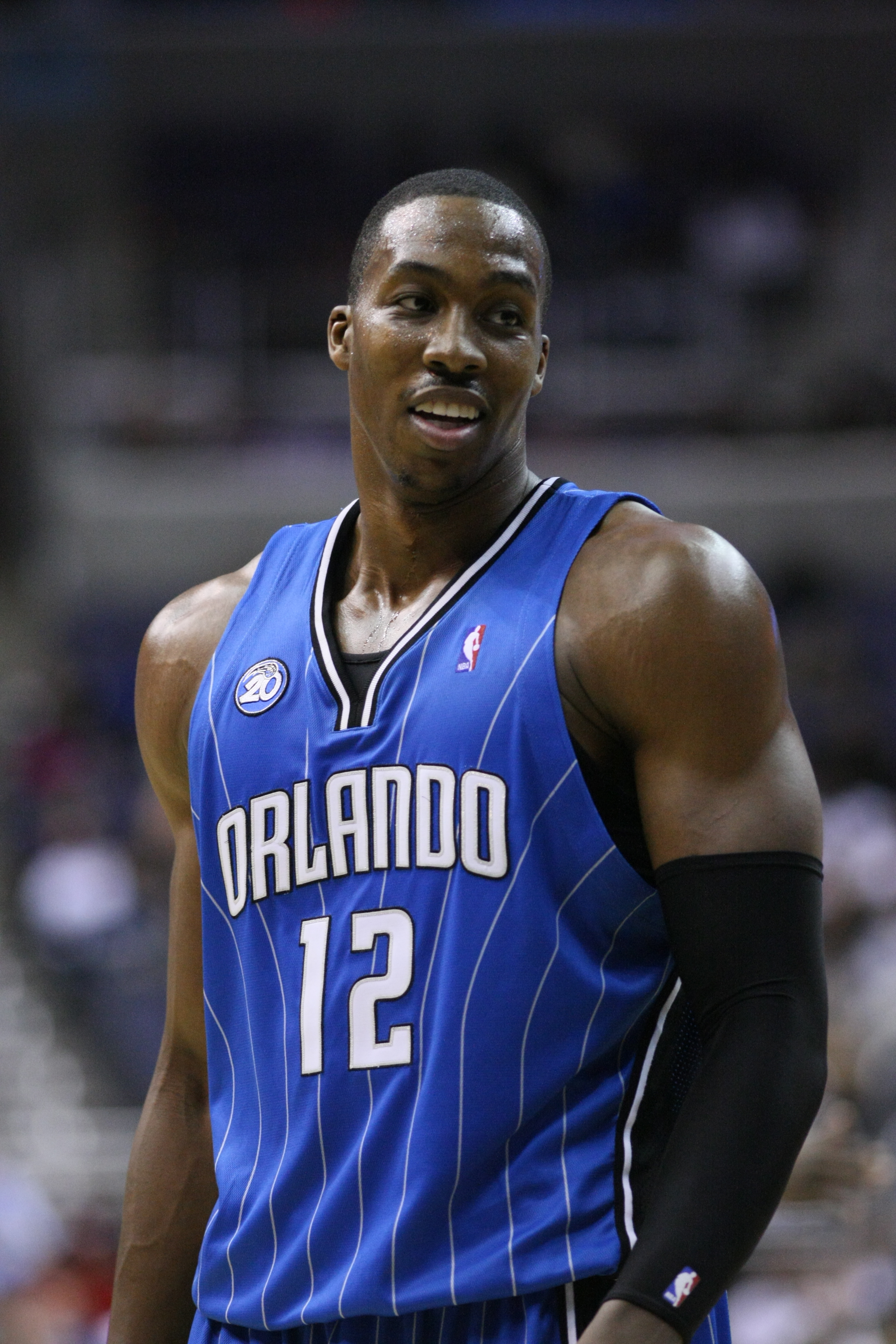
Dwight Howard was named to the All-Rookie First Team in the 2004–05 NBA season.

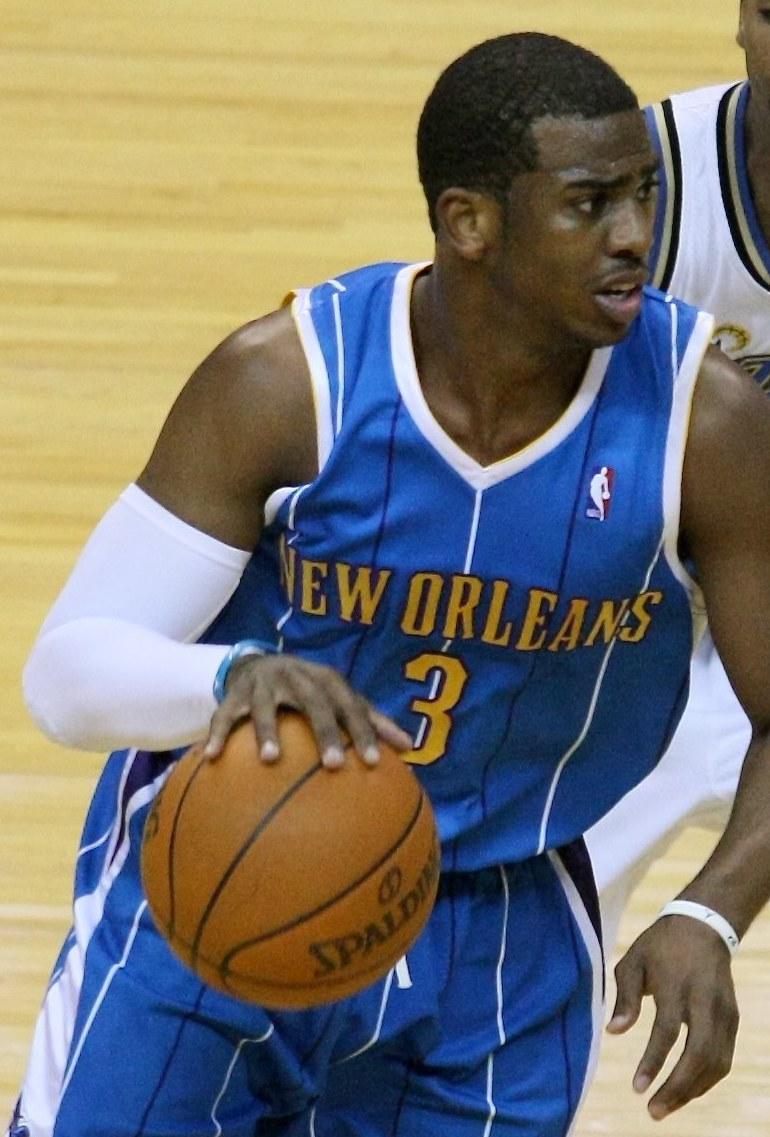
Chris Paul was named to the All-Rookie First Team in the 2005–06 NBA season.

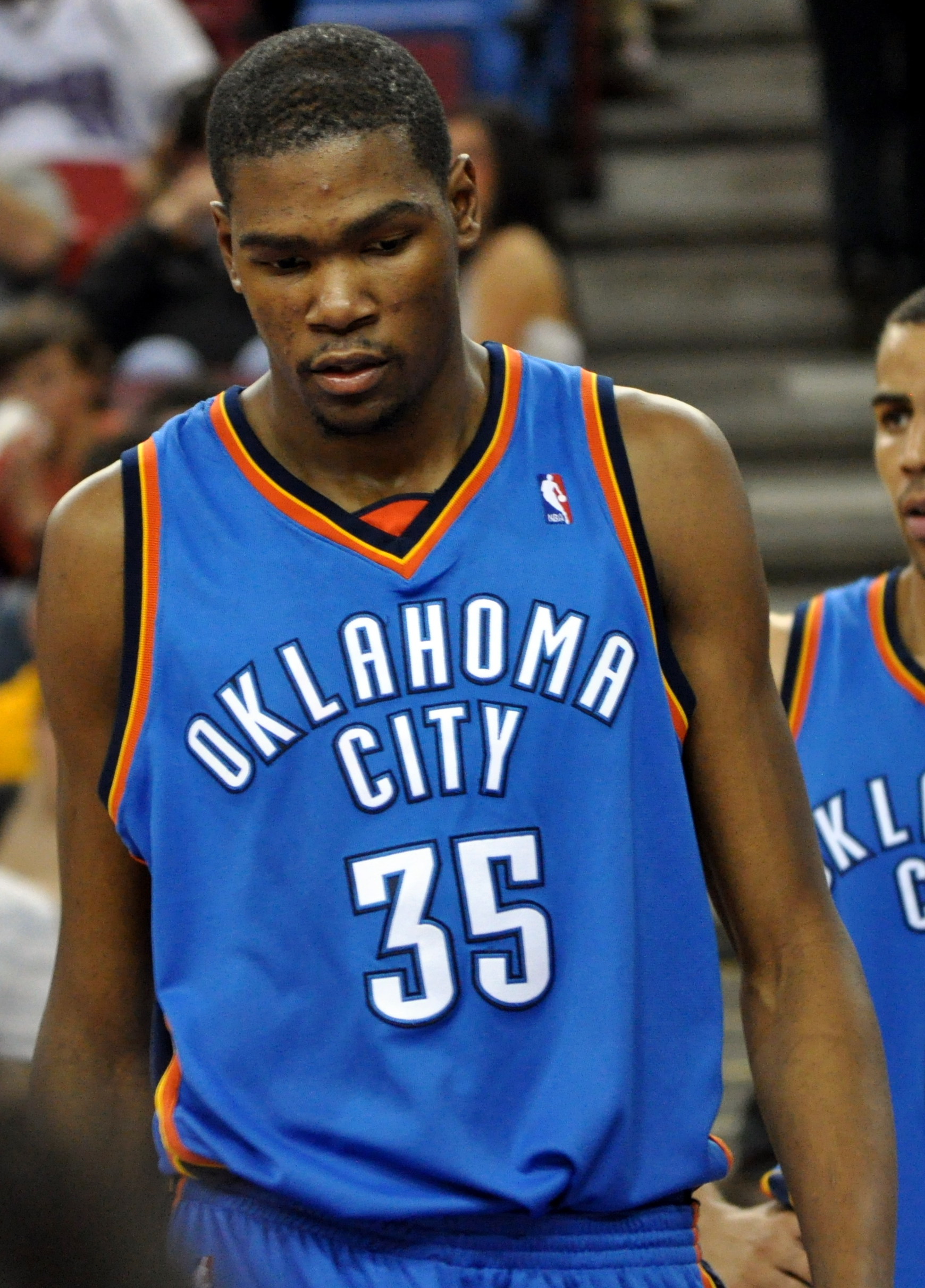
Kevin Durant was named to the All-Rookie First Team in the 2007–08 NBA season.

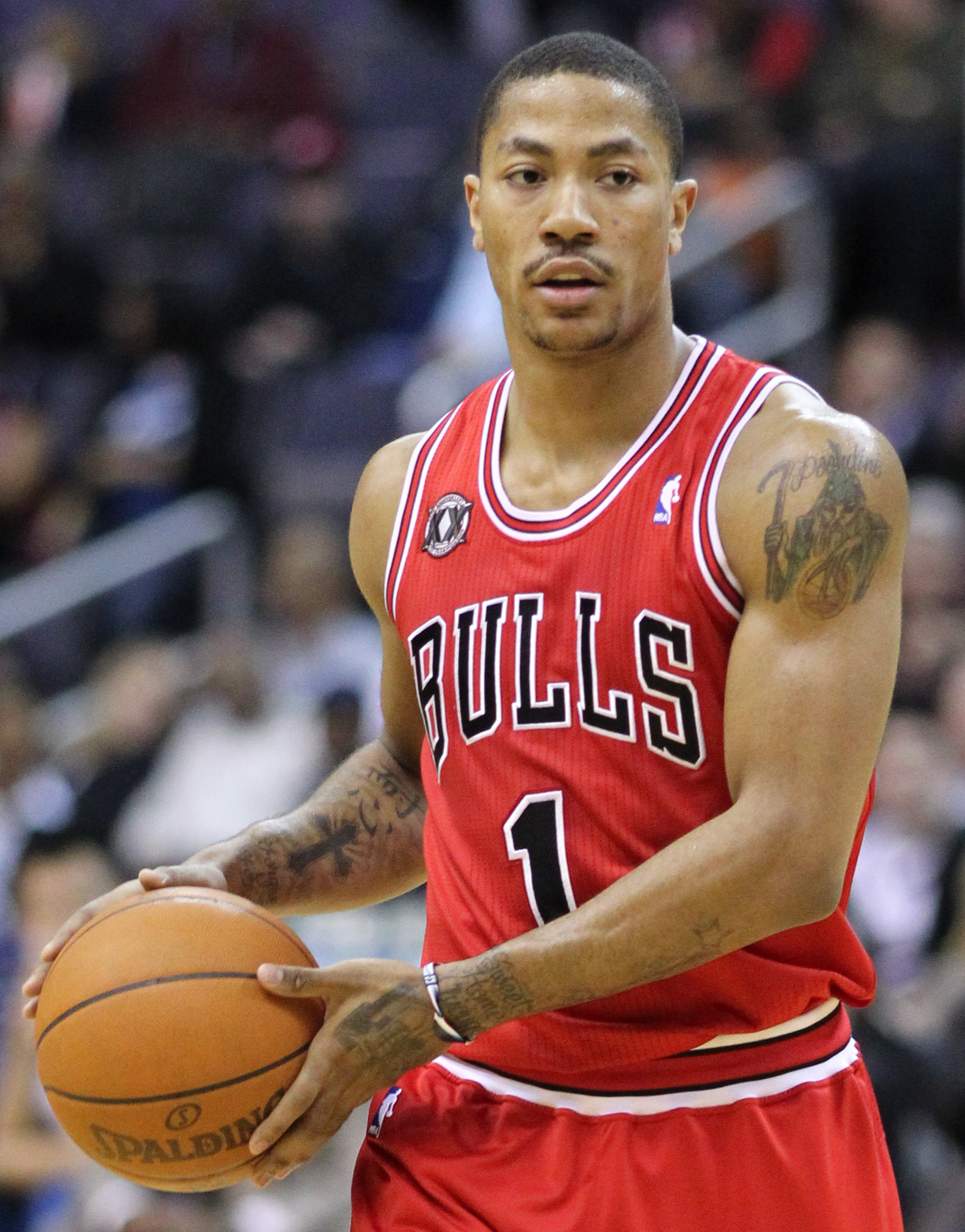
Derrick Rose was named to the All-Rookie First Team in the 2008–09 NBA season.

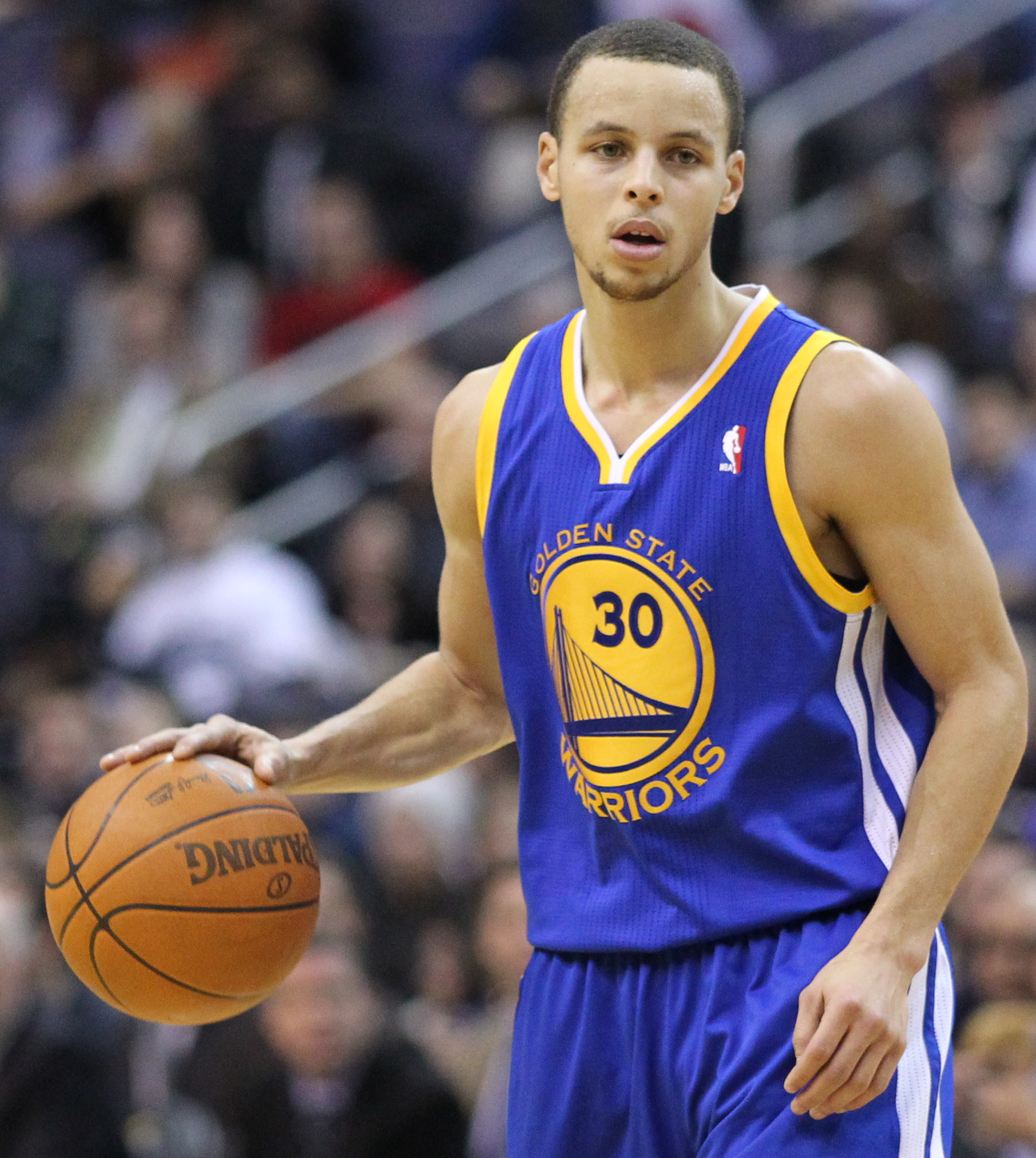
Stephen Curry was named to the All-Rookie First Team in the 2009–10 NBA season.

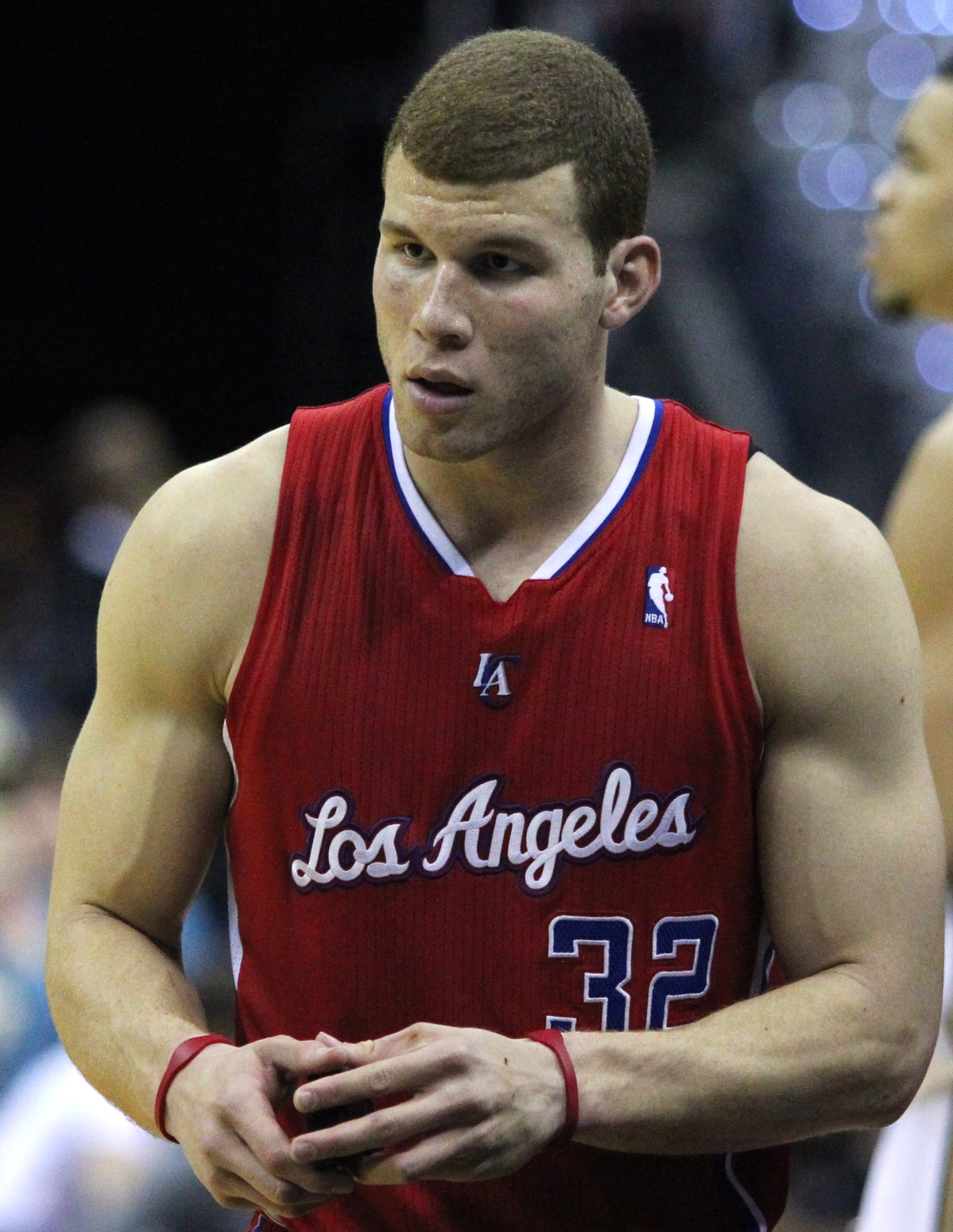
Blake Griffin was named to the All-Rookie First Team in the 2010–11 NBA season.

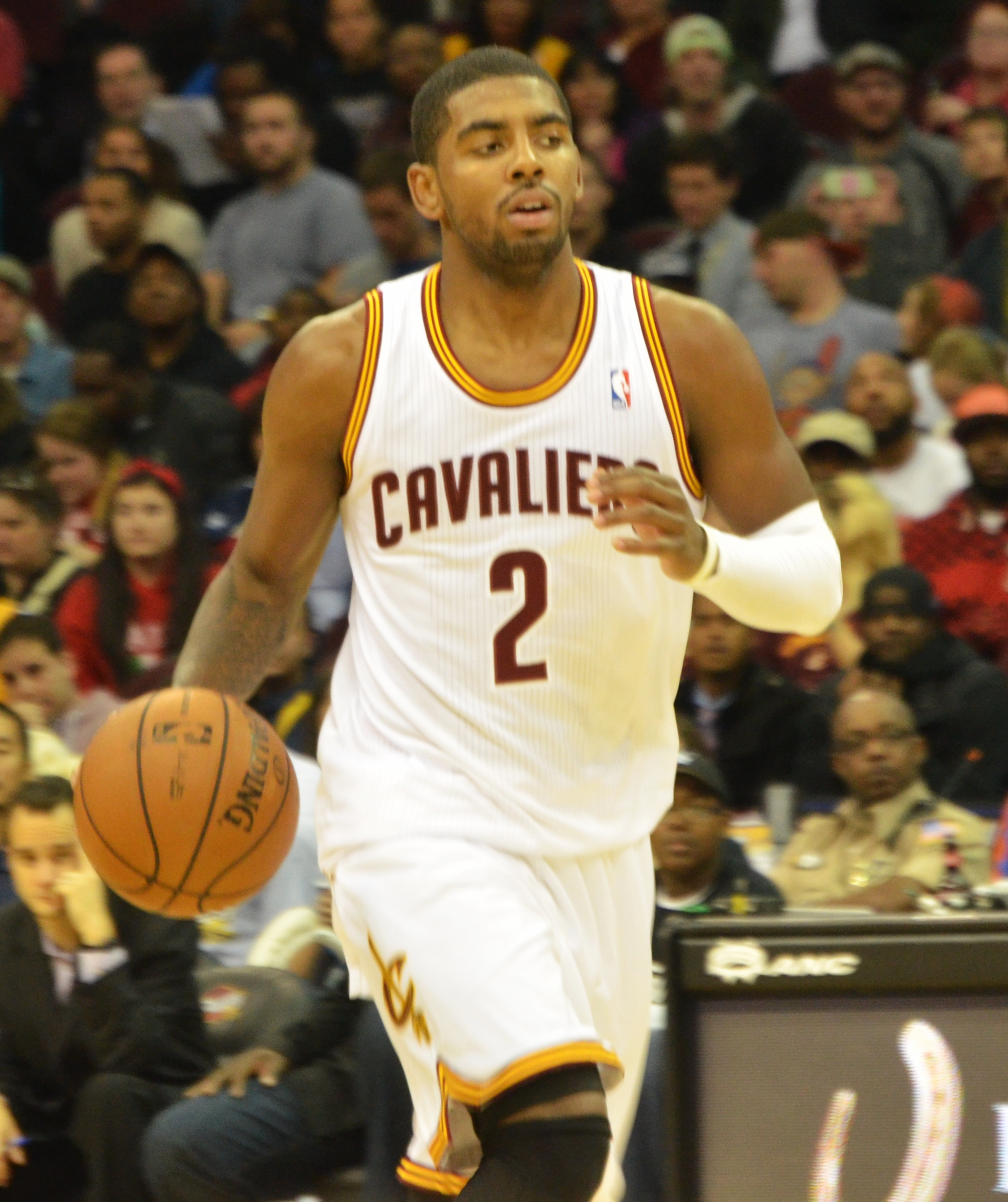
Kyrie Irving was named to the All-Rookie First Team in the 2011–12 NBA season.

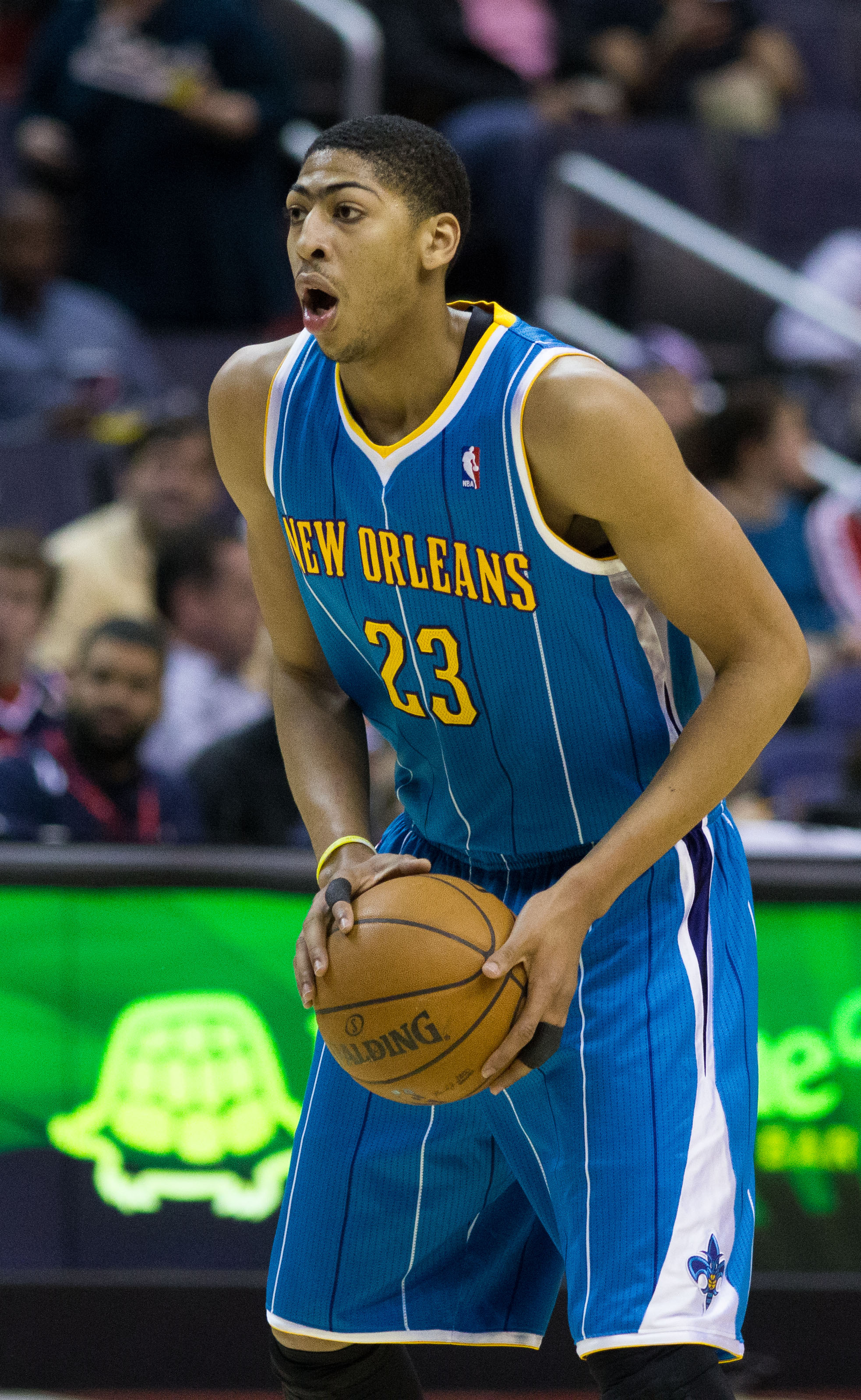
Anthony Davis was named to the All-Rookie First Team in the 2012–13 NBA season.

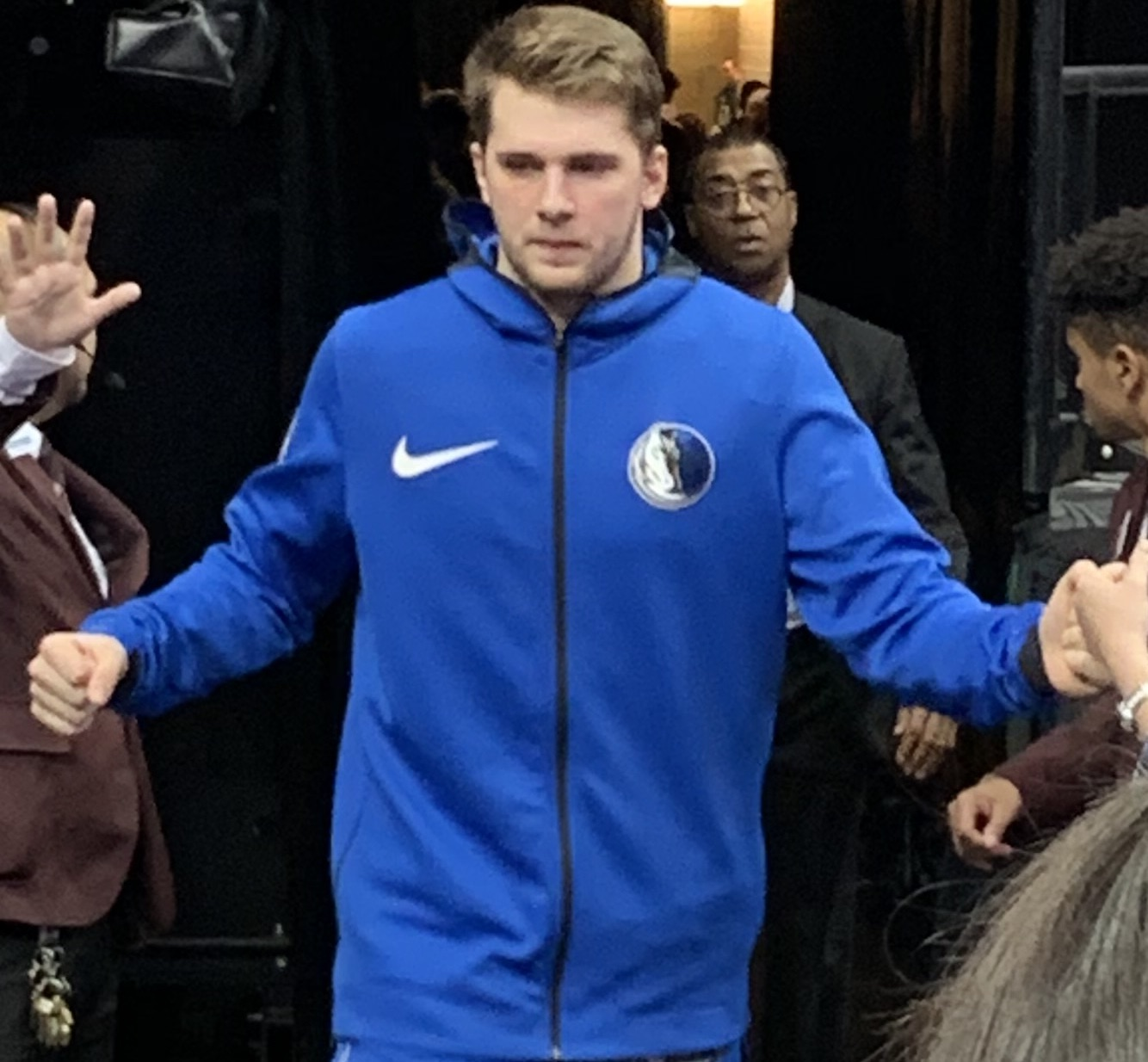
Luka Dončić was named to the All-Rookie First Team in the 2018–19 NBA season.

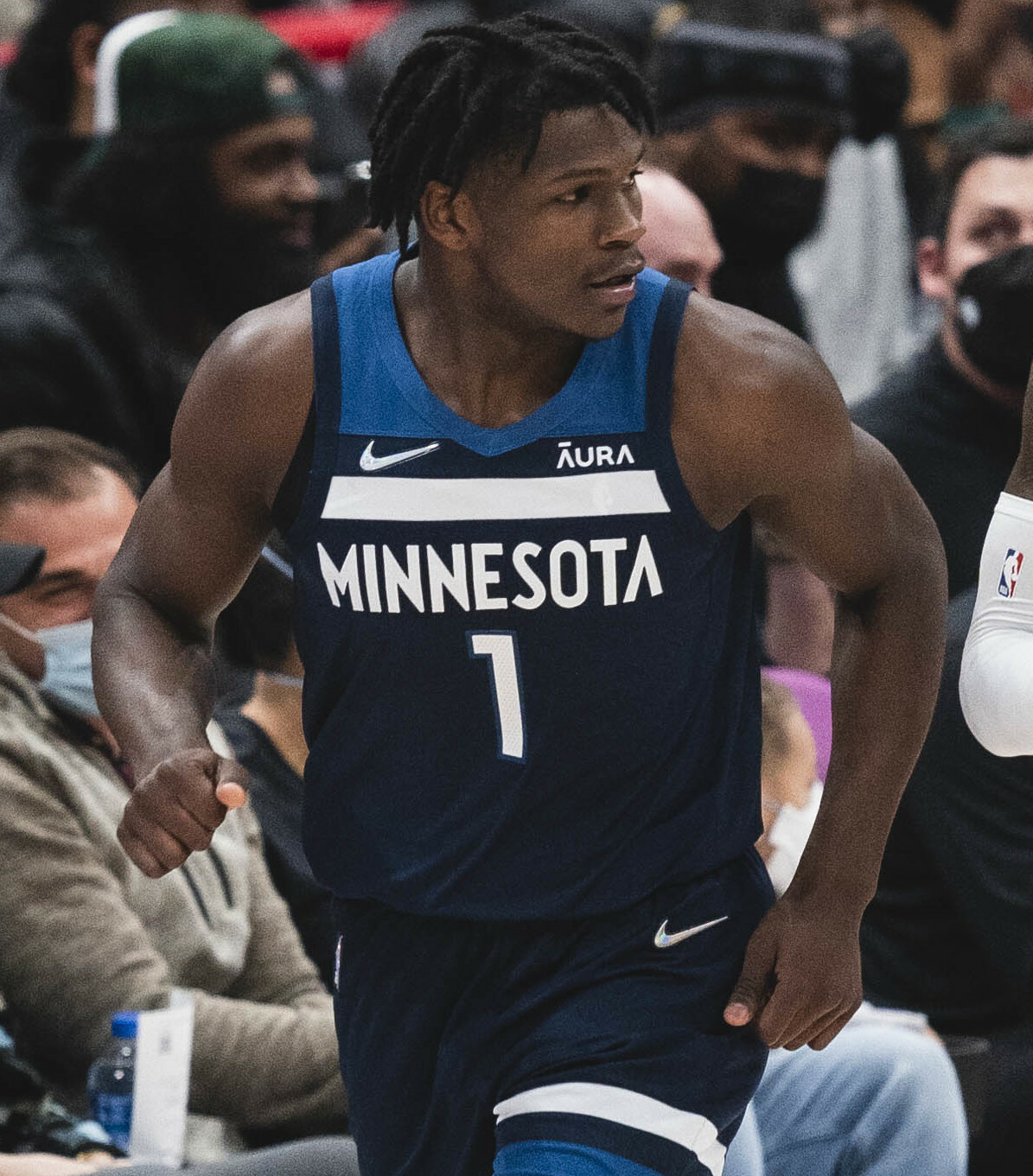
Anthony Edwards was named to the All-Rookie First Team in the 2020–21 NBA season.

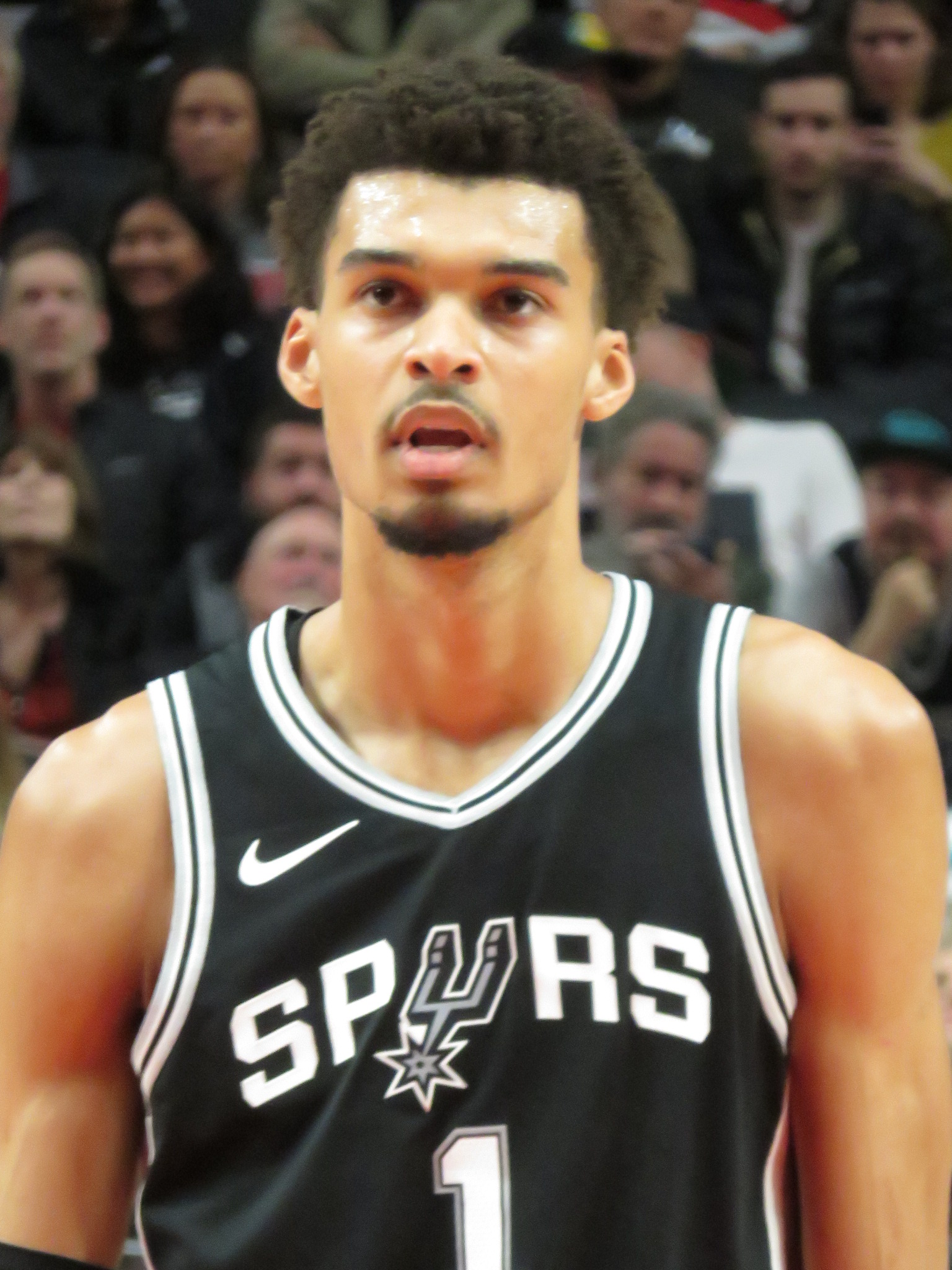
Victor Wembanyama was named to the All-Rookie First Team in the 2023–24 NBA season.

Season	First team		Second team	
Season	Players	Teams	Players	Teams
1962–63	(United States) **Terry Dischinger**	Chicago Zephyrs	No second team	
1962–63	(United States) Chet Walker*	Syracuse Nationals	No second team	
1962–63	(United States) Zelmo Beaty*	St. Louis Hawks	No second team	
1962–63	(United States) John Havlicek*	Boston Celtics	No second team	
1962–63	(United States) Dave DeBusschere*	Detroit Pistons	No second team	
1963–64	(United States) **Jerry Lucas***	Cincinnati Royals	No second team	
1963–64	(United States) Gus Johnson*	Baltimore Bullets	No second team	
1963–64	(United States) Nate Thurmond*	San Francisco Warriors	No second team	
1963–64	(United States) Art Heyman	New York Knicks	No second team	
1963–64	(United States) Rod Thorn	Baltimore Bullets (2)	No second team	
1964–65	(United States) **Willis Reed***	New York Knicks (2)	No second team	
1964–65	(United States) Jim Barnes	New York Knicks (3)	No second team	
1964–65	(United States) Howard Komives	New York Knicks (4)	No second team	
1964–65	(United States) Lucious Jackson	Philadelphia 76ers	No second team	
1964–65	(United States) Wali Jones (tie)	Baltimore Bullets (3)	No second team	
1964–65	(United States) Joe Caldwell (tie)	Detroit Pistons (2)	No second team	
1965–66	(United States) **Rick Barry***	San Francisco Warriors (2)	No second team	
1965–66	(United States) Billy Cunningham*	Philadelphia 76ers (2)	No second team	
1965–66	(United States) Tom Van Arsdale	Detroit Pistons (3)	No second team	
1965–66	(United States) Dick Van Arsdale	New York Knicks (5)	No second team	
1965–66	(United States) Fred Hetzel	San Francisco Warriors (3)	No second team	
1966–67	(United States) Lou Hudson*	St. Louis Hawks (2)	No second team	
1966–67	(United States) Jack Marin	Baltimore Bullets (4)	No second team	
1966–67	(United States) Erwin Mueller	Chicago Bulls	No second team	
1966–67	(United States) Cazzie Russell	New York Knicks (6)	No second team	
1966–67	(United States) **Dave Bing***	Detroit Pistons (4)	No second team	
1967–68	(United States) **Earl Monroe***	Baltimore Bullets (5)	No second team	
1967–68	(United States) Bob Rule	Seattle SuperSonics	No second team	
1967–68	(United States) Walt Frazier*	New York Knicks (7)	No second team	
1967–68	(United States) Al Tucker	Seattle SuperSonics (2)	No second team	
1967–68	(United States) Phil Jackson	New York Knicks (8)	No second team	
1968–69	(United States) **Wes Unseld***	Baltimore Bullets (6)	No second team	
1968–69	(United States) Elvin Hayes*	San Diego Rockets	No second team	
1968–69	(United States) Bill Hewitt	Los Angeles Lakers	No second team	
1968–69	(United States) Art Harris	Seattle SuperSonics (3)	No second team	
1968–69	(United States) Gary Gregor	Phoenix Suns	No second team	
1969–70	(United States) **Lew Alcindor***^{[a]}	Milwaukee Bucks	No second team	
1969–70	(United States) Bob Dandridge*	Milwaukee Bucks (2)	No second team	
1969–70	(United States) Jo Jo White*	Boston Celtics (2)	No second team	
1969–70	(United States) Mike Davis	Baltimore Bullets (7)	No second team	
1969–70	(United States) Dick Garrett	Los Angeles Lakers (2)	No second team	
1970–71	(United States) **Geoff Petrie**	Portland Trail Blazers	No second team	
1970–71	(United States) **Dave Cowens***	Boston Celtics (3)	No second team	
1970–71	(United States) Pete Maravich*	Atlanta Hawks (3)	No second team	
1970–71	(United States) Calvin Murphy*	San Diego Rockets (2)	No second team	
1970–71	(United States) Bob Lanier*	Detroit Pistons (5)	No second team	
1971–72	(United States) Elmore Smith	Buffalo Braves	No second team	
1971–72	(United States) **Sidney Wicks**	Portland Trail Blazers (2)	No second team	
1971–72	(United States) Austin Carr	Cleveland Cavaliers	No second team	
1971–72	(United States) Phil Chenier	Baltimore Bullets (8)	No second team	
1971–72	(United States) Clifford Ray	Chicago Bulls (2)	No second team	
1972–73	(United States) **Bob McAdoo***	Buffalo Braves (2)	No second team	
1972–73	(United States) Lloyd Neal	Portland Trail Blazers (3)	No second team	
1972–73	(United States) Fred Boyd	Philadelphia 76ers (3)	No second team	
1972–73	(United States) Dwight Davis	Cleveland Cavaliers (2)	No second team	
1972–73	(United States) Jim Price	Los Angeles Lakers (3)	No second team	
1973–74	(United States) **Ernie DiGregorio**	Buffalo Braves (3)	No second team	
1973–74	(United States) Ron Behagen	Kansas City–Omaha Kings (2)	No second team	
1973–74	(United States) Mike Bantom	Phoenix Suns (2)	No second team	
1973–74	(United States) John Brown	Atlanta Hawks (4)	No second team	
1973–74	(United States) Nick Weatherspoon	Capital Bullets (9)	No second team	
1974–75	(United States) **Jamaal Wilkes***	Golden State Warriors (4)	No second team	
1974–75	(United States) John Drew	Atlanta Hawks (5)	No second team	
1974–75	(United States) Scott Wedman	Kansas City–Omaha Kings (3)	No second team	
1974–75	(United States) Tommy Burleson	Seattle SuperSonics (4)	No second team	
1974–75	(United States) Brian Winters	Los Angeles Lakers (4)	No second team	
1975–76	(United States) **Alvan Adams**	Phoenix Suns (3)	No second team	
1975–76	(United States) Gus Williams	Golden State Warriors (5)	No second team	
1975–76	(United States) Joe Meriweather	Houston Rockets (3)	No second team	
1975–76	(United States) John Shumate	Buffalo Braves (4)	No second team	
1975–76	(United States) Lionel Hollins	Portland Trail Blazers (4)	No second team	
1976–77	(United States) **Adrian Dantley***	Buffalo Braves (5)	No second team	
1976–77	(United States) Scott May	Chicago Bulls (3)	No second team	
1976–77	(United States) Mitch Kupchak	Washington Bullets (10)	No second team	
1976–77	(United States) John Lucas	Houston Rockets (4)	No second team	
1976–77	(United States) Ron Lee	Phoenix Suns (4)	No second team	
1977–78	(United States) **Walter Davis***	Phoenix Suns (5)	No second team	
1977–78	(United States) Marques Johnson	Milwaukee Bucks (3)	No second team	
1977–78	(United States) Bernard King*	New Jersey Nets	No second team	
1977–78	(United States) Jack Sikma*	Seattle SuperSonics (5)	No second team	
1977–78	(United States) Norm Nixon	Los Angeles Lakers (5)	No second team	
1978–79	(United States) **Phil Ford**	Kansas City Kings (4)	No second team	
1978–79	(The Bahamas) Mychal Thompson	Portland Trail Blazers (5)	No second team	
1978–79	(United States) Ron Brewer	Portland Trail Blazers (6)	No second team	
1978–79	(United States) Reggie Theus	Chicago Bulls (4)	No second team	
1978–79	(United States) Terry Tyler	Detroit Pistons (6)	No second team	
1979–80	(United States) **Larry Bird***	Boston Celtics (4)	No second team	
1979–80	(United States) Magic Johnson*	Los Angeles Lakers (6)	No second team	
1979–80	(United States) Bill Cartwright	New York Knicks (9)	No second team	
1979–80	(United States) Calvin Natt	Portland Trail Blazers (7)	No second team	
1979–80	(United States) David Greenwood	Chicago Bulls (5)	No second team	
1980–81	(United States) Joe Barry Carroll	Golden State Warriors (6)	No second team	
1980–81	(United States) **Darrell Griffith**	Utah Jazz	No second team	
1980–81	(United States) Larry Smith	Golden State Warriors (7)	No second team	
1980–81	(United States) Kevin McHale*	Boston Celtics (5)	No second team	
1980–81	(United States) Kelvin Ransey	Portland Trail Blazers (8)	No second team	
1981–82	(United States) Kelly Tripucka	Detroit Pistons (7)	No second team	
1981–82	(United States) Jay Vincent	Dallas Mavericks	No second team	
1981–82	(United States) Isiah Thomas*	Detroit Pistons (8)	No second team	
1981–82	(United States) **Buck Williams**	New Jersey Nets (2)	No second team	
1981–82	(United States) Jeff Ruland	Washington Bullets (11)	No second team	
1982–83	(United States) **Terry Cummings**	San Diego Clippers (6)	No second team	
1982–83	(United States) Clark Kellogg	Indiana Pacers	No second team	
1982–83	(United States) Dominique Wilkins*	Atlanta Hawks (6)	No second team	
1982–83	(United States) James Worthy*	Los Angeles Lakers (7)	No second team	
1982–83	(United States) Quintin Dailey	Chicago Bulls (6)	No second team	
1983–84	(United States) **Ralph Sampson***	Houston Rockets (5)	No second team	
1983–84	(United States) Steve Stipanovich	Indiana Pacers (2)	No second team	
1983–84	(United States) Byron Scott	Los Angeles Lakers (8)	No second team	
1983–84	(United States) Jeff Malone	Washington Bullets (12)	No second team	
1983–84	(United States) Thurl Bailey (tie)	Utah Jazz (2)	No second team	
1983–84	(United States) Darrell Walker (tie)	New York Knicks (10)	No second team	
1984–85	(United States) **Michael Jordan***	Chicago Bulls (7)	No second team	
1984–85	(Nigeria) Akeem Olajuwon*^{[b]}	Houston Rockets (6)	No second team	
1984–85	(United States) Sam Bowie	Portland Trail Blazers (9)	No second team	
1984–85	(United States) Charles Barkley*	Philadelphia 76ers (4)	No second team	
1984–85	(United States) Sam Perkins	Dallas Mavericks (2)	No second team	
1985–86	(United States) Xavier McDaniel	Seattle SuperSonics (6)	No second team	
1985–86	(Jamaica) **Patrick Ewing***	New York Knicks (11)	No second team	
1985–86	(United States) Karl Malone*	Utah Jazz (3)	No second team	
1985–86	(United States) Joe Dumars*	Detroit Pistons (9)	No second team	
1985–86	(United States) Charles Oakley	Chicago Bulls (8)	No second team	
1986–87	(United States) Brad Daugherty	Cleveland Cavaliers (3)	No second team	
1986–87	(United States) Ron Harper	Cleveland Cavaliers (4)	No second team	
1986–87	(United States) **Chuck Person**	Indiana Pacers (3)	No second team	
1986–87	(United States) Roy Tarpley	Dallas Mavericks (3)	No second team	
1986–87	(United States) John Williams	Cleveland Cavaliers (5)	No second team	
1987–88	(United States) **Mark Jackson**	New York Knicks (12)	No second team	
1987–88	(United States) Armen Gilliam	Phoenix Suns (6)	No second team	
1987–88	(United States) Kenny Smith	Sacramento Kings (5)	No second team	
1987–88	(United States) Greg Anderson	San Antonio Spurs	No second team	
1987–88	(United States) Derrick McKey	Seattle SuperSonics (7)	No second team	
1988–89	(United States) **Mitch Richmond***	Golden State Warriors (8)	(United States) Brian Shaw	Boston Celtics (6)
1988–89	(United States) Willie Anderson	San Antonio Spurs (2)	(United States) Rex Chapman	Charlotte Hornets
1988–89	(United States) Hersey Hawkins	Philadelphia 76ers (5)	(United States) Chris Morris	New Jersey Nets (3)
1988–89	(Netherlands) Rik Smits	Indiana Pacers (4)	(United States) Rod Strickland	New York Knicks (13)
1988–89	(United States) Charles Smith	Los Angeles Clippers (7)	(United States) Kevin Edwards	Miami Heat
1989–90	(United States) **David Robinson***^{[c]}	San Antonio Spurs (3)	(United States) J. R. Reid	Charlotte Hornets (2)
1989–90	(United States) Tim Hardaway*	Golden State Warriors (9)	(United States) Sean Elliott	San Antonio Spurs (4)
1989–90	(Socialist Federal Republic of Yugoslavia) Vlade Divac*	Los Angeles Lakers (9)	(United States) Stacey King	Chicago Bulls (9)
1989–90	(United States) Sherman Douglas	Miami Heat (2)	(United States) Blue Edwards	Utah Jazz (4)
1989–90	(United States) Pooh Richardson	Minnesota Timberwolves	(United States) Glen Rice	Miami Heat (3)
1990–91	(United States) Kendall Gill	Charlotte Hornets (3)	(United States) Chris Jackson	Denver Nuggets
1990–91	(United States) Dennis Scott	Orlando Magic	(United States) Gary Payton*	Seattle SuperSonics (8)
1990–91	(United States) Dee Brown	Boston Celtics (7)	(United States) Felton Spencer	Minnesota Timberwolves (2)
1990–91	(United States) Lionel Simmons	Sacramento Kings (6)	(United States) Travis Mays	Sacramento Kings (7)
1990–91	(United States) **Derrick Coleman**	New Jersey Nets (4)	(United States) Willie Burton	Miami Heat (4)
1991–92	(United States) **Larry Johnson**	Charlotte Hornets (4)	(Canada) Rick Fox	Boston Celtics (8)
1991–92	(Zaire) Dikembe Mutombo*	Denver Nuggets (2)	(United States) Terrell Brandon	Cleveland Cavaliers (6)
1991–92	(United States) Billy Owens	Golden State Warriors (10)	(United States) Larry Stewart	Washington Bullets (13)
1991–92	(United States) Steve Smith	Miami Heat (5)	(United States) Stanley Roberts	Orlando Magic (2)
1991–92	(United States) Stacey Augmon	Atlanta Hawks (7)	(United States) Mark Macon	Denver Nuggets (3)
1992–93	(United States) **Shaquille O'Neal***	Orlando Magic (3)	(United States) Walt Williams	Sacramento Kings (8)
1992–93	(United States) Alonzo Mourning*	Charlotte Hornets (5)	(United States) Robert Horry	Houston Rockets (7)
1992–93	(United States) Christian Laettner	Minnesota Timberwolves (3)	(United States) Latrell Sprewell	Golden State Warriors (11)
1992–93	(United States) Tom Gugliotta	Washington Bullets (14)	(United States) Clarence Weatherspoon	Philadelphia 76ers (6)
1992–93	(United States) LaPhonso Ellis	Denver Nuggets (4)	(United States) Richard Dumas^{[d]}	Phoenix Suns (7)
1993–94	(United States) **Chris Webber***	Golden State Warriors (12)	(Croatia) Dino Rađa*	Boston Celtics (9)
1993–94	(United States) Penny Hardaway	Orlando Magic (4)	(United States) Nick Van Exel	Los Angeles Lakers (10)
1993–94	(United States) Vin Baker	Milwaukee Bucks (4)	(Germany) Shawn Bradley	Philadelphia 76ers (7)
1993–94	(United States) Jamal Mashburn	Dallas Mavericks (4)	(Croatia) Toni Kukoč*	Chicago Bulls (10)
1993–94	(United States) Isaiah Rider	Minnesota Timberwolves (4)	(United States) Lindsey Hunter	Detroit Pistons (10)
1994–95	(United States) **Jason Kidd***	Dallas Mavericks (5)	(United States) Juwan Howard	Washington Bullets (15)
1994–95	(United States) **Grant Hill***	Detroit Pistons (11)	(United States) Eric Montross	Boston Celtics (10)
1994–95	(United States) Glenn Robinson	Milwaukee Bucks (5)	(United States) Wesley Person	Phoenix Suns (8)
1994–95	(United States) Eddie Jones	Los Angeles Lakers (11)	(United States) Jalen Rose	Denver Nuggets (5)
1994–95	(United States) Brian Grant	Sacramento Kings (9)	(United States) Donyell Marshall (tie)	Golden State Warriors (13)
1994–95	(United States) Brian Grant	Sacramento Kings (9)	(United States) Sharone Wright (tie)	Philadelphia 76ers (8)
1995–96	(United States) **Damon Stoudamire**	Toronto Raptors	(United States) Kevin Garnett*	Minnesota Timberwolves (5)
1995–96	(United States) Joe Smith	Golden State Warriors (14)	(United States) Bryant Reeves	Vancouver Grizzlies
1995–96	(United States) Jerry Stackhouse	Philadelphia 76ers (9)	(United States) Brent Barry	Los Angeles Clippers (8)
1995–96	(United States) Antonio McDyess	Denver Nuggets (6)	(United States) Rasheed Wallace	Washington Bullets (16)
1995–96	(Lithuania) Arvydas Sabonis* (tie)	Portland Trail Blazers (10)	(United States) Tyus Edney	Sacramento Kings (10)
1995–96	(United States) Michael Finley (tie)	Phoenix Suns (9)	(United States) Tyus Edney	Sacramento Kings (10)
1996–97	(United States) Shareef Abdur-Rahim	Vancouver Grizzlies (2)	(United States) Kerry Kittles	New Jersey Nets (5)
1996–97	(United States) **Allen Iverson***	Philadelphia 76ers (10)	(United States) Ray Allen*	Milwaukee Bucks (6)
1996–97	(United States) Stephon Marbury	Minnesota Timberwolves (6)	(United States) Travis Knight	Los Angeles Lakers (12)
1996–97	(United States) Marcus Camby	Toronto Raptors (2)	(United States) Kobe Bryant*	Los Angeles Lakers (13)
1996–97	(United States) Antoine Walker	Boston Celtics (11)	(United States) Matt Maloney	Houston Rockets (8)
1997–98	(United States Virgin Islands) **Tim Duncan***	San Antonio Spurs (5)	(United States) Tim Thomas	Philadelphia 76ers (11)
1997–98	(United States) Keith Van Horn	New Jersey Nets (6)	(United States) Cedric Henderson	Cleveland Cavaliers (9)
1997–98	(United States) Brevin Knight	Cleveland Cavaliers (7)	(United States) Derek Anderson	Cleveland Cavaliers (10)
1997–98	(Lithuania) Žydrūnas Ilgauskas	Cleveland Cavaliers (8)	(United States) Maurice Taylor	Los Angeles Clippers (9)
1997–98	(United States) Ron Mercer	Boston Celtics (12)	(United States) Bobby Jackson	Denver Nuggets (7)
1998–99	(United States) **Vince Carter***	Toronto Raptors (3)	(United States) Michael Dickerson	Houston Rockets (9)
1998–99	(United States) Paul Pierce*	Boston Celtics (13)	(United States) Michael Doleac	Orlando Magic (5)
1998–99	(United States) Jason Williams	Sacramento Kings (11)	(United States) Cuttino Mobley	Houston Rockets (10)
1998–99	(United States) Mike Bibby	Vancouver Grizzlies (3)	(Nigeria) Michael Olowokandi	Los Angeles Clippers (10)
1998–99	(United States) Matt Harpring	Orlando Magic (6)	(United States) Antawn Jamison	Golden State Warriors (15)
1999–00	(United States) **Elton Brand**	Chicago Bulls (11)	(United States) Shawn Marion	Phoenix Suns (10)
1999–00	(United States) **Steve Francis**	Houston Rockets (11)	(United States) Ron Artest^{[e]}	Chicago Bulls (12)
1999–00	(United States) Lamar Odom	Los Angeles Clippers (11)	(United States) James Posey	Denver Nuggets (8)
1999–00	(United States) Wally Szczerbiak	Minnesota Timberwolves (7)	(United States) Jason Terry	Atlanta Hawks (8)
1999–00	(United States) Andre Miller	Cleveland Cavaliers (11)	(United States) Chucky Atkins	Orlando Magic (7)
2000–01	(United States) **Mike Miller**	Orlando Magic (8)	(Turkey) Hedo Türkoğlu	Sacramento Kings (12)
2000–01	(United States) Kenyon Martin	New Jersey Nets (7)	(United States) Desmond Mason	Seattle SuperSonics (9)
2000–01	(United States) Marc Jackson	Golden State Warriors (16)	(United States) Courtney Alexander	Washington Wizards (17)
2000–01	(United States) Morris Peterson	Toronto Raptors (4)	(United States) Marcus Fizer	Chicago Bulls (13)
2000–01	(United States) Darius Miles	Los Angeles Clippers (12)	(United States) Chris Mihm	Cleveland Cavaliers (12)
2001–02	(Spain) **Pau Gasol***	Memphis Grizzlies (4)	(United States) Jamaal Tinsley	Indiana Pacers (5)
2001–02	(United States) Shane Battier	Memphis Grizzlies (5)	(United States) Richard Jefferson	New Jersey Nets (8)
2001–02	(United States) Jason Richardson	Golden State Warriors (17)	(United States) Eddie Griffin	Houston Rockets (12)
2001–02	(France) Tony Parker*	San Antonio Spurs (6)	(Serbia and Montenegro) Željko Rebrača	Detroit Pistons (12)
2001–02	(Russia) Andrei Kirilenko	Utah Jazz (5)	(Serbia and Montenegro) Vladimir Radmanović (tie)	Seattle SuperSonics (10)
2001–02	(Russia) Andrei Kirilenko	Utah Jazz (5)	(United States) Joe Johnson (tie)	Phoenix Suns (11)
2002–03	(China) Yao Ming*	Houston Rockets (13)	(Argentina) Manu Ginóbili*	San Antonio Spurs (7)
2002–03	(United States) **Amare Stoudemire***^{[f]}	Phoenix Suns (12)	(Croatia) Gordan Giriček	Memphis Grizzlies (6); Orlando Magic (9)
2002–03	(United States) Caron Butler	Miami Heat (6)	(United States) Carlos Boozer	Cleveland Cavaliers (13)
2002–03	(United States) Drew Gooden	Memphis Grizzlies (7); Orlando Magic (10)	(United States) Jay Williams	Chicago Bulls (14)
2002–03	(Brazil) Nenê Hilario^{[g]}	Denver Nuggets (9)	(United States) J. R. Bremer	Boston Celtics (14)
2003–04	(United States) Carmelo Anthony*	Denver Nuggets (10)	(United States) Josh Howard	Dallas Mavericks (6)
2003–04	(United States) **LeBron James**^	Cleveland Cavaliers (14)	(United States) T. J. Ford	Milwaukee Bucks (7)
2003–04	(United States) Dwyane Wade*	Miami Heat (7)	(United States) Udonis Haslem	Miami Heat (8)
2003–04	(United States) Chris Bosh*	Toronto Raptors (5)	(United States) Jarvis Hayes	Washington Wizards (18)
2003–04	(United States) Kirk Hinrich	Chicago Bulls (15)	(United States) Marquis Daniels	Dallas Mavericks (7)
2004–05	(United States) **Emeka Okafor**	Charlotte Bobcats (6)	(Serbia and Montenegro) Nenad Krstić	New Jersey Nets (9)
2004–05	(United States) Dwight Howard*	Orlando Magic (11)	(United States) Josh Smith	Atlanta Hawks (9)
2004–05	(United Kingdom) Ben Gordon	Chicago Bulls (16)	(United States) Josh Childress	Atlanta Hawks (10)
2004–05	(United States) Andre Iguodala	Philadelphia 76ers (12)	(United States) Jameer Nelson	Orlando Magic (12)
2004–05	(United Kingdom) Luol Deng	Chicago Bulls (17)	(United States) Al Jefferson	Boston Celtics (15)
2005–06	(United States) **Chris Paul**^{†}	New Orleans/Oklahoma City Hornets	(United States) Danny Granger	Indiana Pacers (6)
2005–06	(Dominican Republic) Charlie Villanueva	Toronto Raptors (6)	(United States) Raymond Felton	Charlotte Bobcats (7)
2005–06	(Australia) Andrew Bogut	Milwaukee Bucks (8)	(United States) Luther Head	Houston Rockets (14)
2005–06	(United States) Deron Williams^	Utah Jazz (6)	(United States) Marvin Williams	Atlanta Hawks (11)
2005–06	(United States) Channing Frye	New York Knicks (14)	(United States) Ryan Gomes	Boston Celtics (16)
2006–07	(United States) **Brandon Roy**	Portland Trail Blazers (11)	(United States) Paul Millsap	Utah Jazz (7)
2006–07	(Italy) Andrea Bargnani	Toronto Raptors (7)	(United States) Adam Morrison	Charlotte Bobcats (8)
2006–07	(United States) Randy Foye	Minnesota Timberwolves (8)	(United States) Tyrus Thomas	Chicago Bulls (18)
2006–07	(United States) Rudy Gay	Memphis Grizzlies (8)	(United States) Craig Smith	Minnesota Timberwolves (9)
2006–07	(Spain) Jorge Garbajosa (tie)	Toronto Raptors (8)	(United States) Rajon Rondo (tie)	Boston Celtics (17)
2006–07	(United States) LaMarcus Aldridge (tie)	Portland Trail Blazers (12)	(Argentina) Walter Herrmann (tie)	Charlotte Bobcats (9)
2006–07	(United States) Marcus Williams (tie)	New Jersey Nets (10)	(Argentina) Walter Herrmann (tie)	Charlotte Bobcats (9)
2007–08	(Dominican Republic) Al Horford^	Atlanta Hawks (12)	(United States) Jamario Moon	Toronto Raptors (9)
2007–08	(United States) **Kevin Durant**^	Seattle SuperSonics (11)	(Spain) Juan Carlos Navarro	Memphis Grizzlies (9)
2007–08	(Argentina) Luis Scola	Houston Rockets (15)	(United States) Thaddeus Young^{§}	Philadelphia 76ers (13)
2007–08	(United States) Al Thornton	Los Angeles Clippers (13)	(United States) Rodney Stuckey	Detroit Pistons (13)
2007–08	(United States) Jeff Green^{†}	Seattle SuperSonics (12)	(United States) Carl Landry	Houston Rockets (16)
2008–09	(United States) **Derrick Rose**^{§}	Chicago Bulls (19)	(The Bahamas) Eric Gordon	Los Angeles Clippers (14)
2008–09	(United States) O. J. Mayo	Memphis Grizzlies (10)	(United States) Kevin Love^{†}	Minnesota Timberwolves (10)
2008–09	(United States) Russell Westbrook^{†}	Oklahoma City Thunder (13)	(United States) Mario Chalmers	Miami Heat (10)
2008–09	(United States) Brook Lopez^	New Jersey Nets (11)	(Spain) Marc Gasol	Memphis Grizzlies (11)
2008–09	(United States) Michael Beasley	Miami Heat (9)	(United States) D. J. Augustin (tie)	Charlotte Bobcats (10)
2008–09	(United States) Michael Beasley	Miami Heat (9)	(Spain) Rudy Fernández (tie)	Portland Trail Blazers (13)
2009–10	(United States) **Tyreke Evans**	Sacramento Kings (13)	(United States) Marcus Thornton	New Orleans Hornets (2)
2009–10	(United States) Brandon Jennings	Milwaukee Bucks (9)	(United States) DeJuan Blair	San Antonio Spurs (8)
2009–10	(United States) Stephen Curry^	Golden State Warriors (18)	(United States) James Harden^	Oklahoma City Thunder (14)
2009–10	(United States) Darren Collison	New Orleans Hornets (3)	(United States) Jonny Flynn	Minnesota Timberwolves (11)
2009–10	(United States) Taj Gibson^{†}	Chicago Bulls (20)	(Sweden) Jonas Jerebko	Detroit Pistons (14)
2010–11	(United States) **Blake Griffin**^{[h]}	Los Angeles Clippers (15)	(United States) Greg Monroe	Detroit Pistons (15)
2010–11	(United States) John Wall	Washington Wizards (19)	(United States) Wesley Johnson	Minnesota Timberwolves (12)
2010–11	(United States) Landry Fields	New York Knicks (15)	(United States) Eric Bledsoe	Los Angeles Clippers (16)
2010–11	(United States) DeMarcus Cousins	Sacramento Kings (14)	(United States) Derrick Favors	Utah Jazz (8)
2010–11	(United States) Gary Neal^	San Antonio Spurs (9)	(United States) Paul George^	Indiana Pacers (7)
2011–12	(United States) **Kyrie Irving**^	Cleveland Cavaliers (15)	(United States) Isaiah Thomas^{§}	Sacramento Kings (15)
2011–12	(Spain) Ricky Rubio^{§}	Minnesota Timberwolves (13)	(United States) MarShon Brooks	New Jersey Nets (12)
2011–12	(United States) Kenneth Faried	Denver Nuggets (11)	(United States) Chandler Parsons	Houston Rockets (17)
2011–12	(United States) Klay Thompson^	Golden State Warriors (19)	(Canada) Tristan Thompson	Cleveland Cavaliers (16)
2011–12	(United States) Kawhi Leonard^ (tie)	San Antonio Spurs (10)	(Canada) Tristan Thompson	Cleveland Cavaliers (16)
2011–12	(United States) Iman Shumpert (tie)	New York Knicks (16)	(United States) Derrick Williams	Minnesota Timberwolves (14)
2011–12	(United States) Brandon Knight (tie)	Detroit Pistons (16)	(United States) Derrick Williams	Minnesota Timberwolves (14)
2012–13	(United States) **Damian Lillard**^	Portland Trail Blazers (14)	(United States) Andre Drummond^	Detroit Pistons (17)
2012–13	(United States) Bradley Beal^	Washington Wizards (20)	(Lithuania) Jonas Valančiūnas^{†}^{[i]}	Toronto Raptors (10)
2012–13	(United States) Anthony Davis^	New Orleans Hornets (4)	(United States) Michael Kidd-Gilchrist	Charlotte Bobcats (11)
2012–13	(United States) Dion Waiters	Cleveland Cavaliers (17)	(United States) Kyle Singler	Detroit Pistons (18)
2012–13	(United States) Harrison Barnes^	Golden State Warriors (20)	(United States) Tyler Zeller	Cleveland Cavaliers (18)
2013–14	(United States) **Michael Carter-Williams**	Philadelphia 76ers (14)	(Canada) Kelly Olynyk	Boston Celtics (18)
2013–14	(United States) Victor Oladipo^{§}	Orlando Magic (13)	(Greece) Giannis Antetokounmpo^	Milwaukee Bucks (10)
2013–14	(United States) Trey Burke	Utah Jazz (10)	(Senegal) Gorgui Dieng	Minnesota Timberwolves (15)
2013–14	(United States) Mason Plumlee^	Brooklyn Nets (13)	(United States) Cody Zeller	Charlotte Bobcats (12)
2013–14	(United States) Tim Hardaway Jr.^	New York Knicks (17)	(New Zealand) Steven Adams^	Oklahoma City Thunder (15)
2014–15	(Canada) **Andrew Wiggins**^	Minnesota Timberwolves (16)	(United States) Marcus Smart^	Boston Celtics (19)
2014–15	(Spain) Nikola Mirotić	Chicago Bulls (21)	(United States) Zach LaVine^	Minnesota Timberwolves (17)
2014–15	(United States) Nerlens Noel	Philadelphia 76ers (15)	(Croatia) Bojan Bogdanović	Brooklyn Nets (14)
2014–15	(United States) Elfrid Payton	Orlando Magic (14)	(Bosnia and Herzegovina) Jusuf Nurkić^	Denver Nuggets (12)
2014–15	(United States) Jordan Clarkson^	Los Angeles Lakers (14)	(United States) Langston Galloway	New York Knicks (18)
2015–16	(Dominican Republic) **Karl-Anthony Towns**^	Minnesota Timberwolves (18)	(United States) Justise Winslow	Miami Heat (11)
2015–16	(Latvia) Kristaps Porziņģis^	New York Knicks (19)	(United States) D'Angelo Russell^{†}	Los Angeles Lakers (15)
2015–16	(United States) Devin Booker^	Phoenix Suns (13)	(Democratic Republic of the Congo) Emmanuel Mudiay	Denver Nuggets (14)
2015–16	(Serbia) Nikola Jokić^^{[j]}	Denver Nuggets (13)	(United States) Myles Turner^	Indiana Pacers (8)
2015–16	(Nigeria) Jahlil Okafor	Philadelphia 76ers (16)	(United States) Willie Cauley-Stein	Sacramento Kings (16)
2016–17	(United States) **Malcolm Brogdon**	Milwaukee Bucks (11)	(Canada) Jamal Murray^	Denver Nuggets (15)
2016–17	(Croatia) Dario Šarić	Philadelphia 76ers (17)	(United States) Jaylen Brown^	Boston Celtics (20)
2016–17	(Cameroon) Joel Embiid^^{[k]}	Philadelphia 76ers (18)	(United States) Marquese Chriss	Phoenix Suns (14)
2016–17	(The Bahamas) Buddy Hield^	New Orleans Pelicans (5)	(United States) Brandon Ingram^	Los Angeles Lakers (16)
2016–17	(Spain) Willy Hernangómez	New York Knicks (20)	(United States) Yogi Ferrell	Dallas Mavericks (8)
2017–18	(Australia) **Ben Simmons**^^{[l]}	Philadelphia 76ers (19)	(United States) Dennis Smith Jr.	Dallas Mavericks (9)
2017–18	(United States) Donovan Mitchell^	Utah Jazz (11)	(United States) Lonzo Ball	Los Angeles Lakers (18)
2017–18	(United States) Jayson Tatum^	Boston Celtics (21)	(United States) John Collins^	Atlanta Hawks (13)
2017–18	(United States) Kyle Kuzma^	Los Angeles Lakers (17)	(Serbia) Bogdan Bogdanović^^{[m]}	Sacramento Kings (17)
2017–18	(Finland) Lauri Markkanen^	Chicago Bulls (22)	(United States) Josh Jackson	Phoenix Suns (15)
2018–19	(Slovenia) **Luka Dončić**^	Dallas Mavericks (10)	(Canada) Shai Gilgeous-Alexander^	Los Angeles Clippers (17)
2018–19	(United States) Trae Young^	Atlanta Hawks (14)	(United States) Collin Sexton^	Cleveland Cavaliers (19)
2018–19	(The Bahamas) Deandre Ayton^	Phoenix Suns (16)	(United States) Landry Shamet^	Los Angeles Clippers (18)
2018–19	(United States) Jaren Jackson Jr.^	Memphis Grizzlies (12)	(United States) Mitchell Robinson^	New York Knicks (21)
2018–19	(United States) Marvin Bagley III^	Sacramento Kings (18)	(United States) Kevin Huerter^	Atlanta Hawks (15)
2019–20	(United States) **Ja Morant**^	Memphis Grizzlies (13)	(United States) Tyler Herro^	Miami Heat (13)
2019–20	(United States) Kendrick Nunn	Miami Heat (12)	(United States) Terence Davis	Toronto Raptors (11)
2019–20	(Canada) Brandon Clarke	Memphis Grizzlies (14)	(United States) Coby White^	Chicago Bulls (23)
2019–20	(United States) Zion Williamson^	New Orleans Pelicans (6)	(United States) P. J. Washington^	Charlotte Hornets (13)
2019–20	(United States) Eric Paschall	Golden State Warriors (21)	(Japan) Rui Hachimura^	Washington Wizards (21)
2020–21	(United States) **LaMelo Ball**^	Charlotte Hornets (14)	(United States) Immanuel Quickley^	New York Knicks (22)
2020–21	(United States) Anthony Edwards^	Minnesota Timberwolves (19)	(United States) Desmond Bane^	Memphis Grizzlies (15)
2020–21	(United States) Tyrese Haliburton^	Sacramento Kings (19)	(United States) Isaiah Stewart^	Detroit Pistons (20)
2020–21	(United States) Saddiq Bey^	Detroit Pistons (19)	(United States) Isaac Okoro^	Cleveland Cavaliers (20)
2020–21	(United States) Jae'Sean Tate^	Houston Rockets (18)	(United States) Patrick Williams^	Chicago Bulls (24)
2021–22	(United States) **Scottie Barnes**^	Toronto Raptors (12)	(United States) Herbert Jones^	New Orleans Pelicans (7)
2021–22	(United States) Evan Mobley^	Cleveland Cavaliers (21)	(Dominican Republic) Chris Duarte	Indiana Pacers (9)
2021–22	(United States) Cade Cunningham^	Detroit Pistons (21)	(United States) Bones Hyland^	Denver Nuggets (16)
2021–22	(Germany) Franz Wagner^	Orlando Magic (15)	(United States) Ayo Dosunmu^	Chicago Bulls (25)
2021–22	(United States) Jalen Green^	Houston Rockets (19)	(Australia) Josh Giddey^	Oklahoma City Thunder (16)
2022–23	(United States) **Paolo Banchero**^	Orlando Magic (16)	(United States) Jalen Duren^	Detroit Pistons (22)
2022–23	(United States) Walker Kessler^	Utah Jazz (12)	(United States) Tari Eason^	Houston Rockets (20)
2022–23	(Canada) Bennedict Mathurin^	Indiana Pacers (10)	(United States) Jaden Ivey	Detroit Pistons (23)
2022–23	(United States) Keegan Murray^	Sacramento Kings (20)	(United States) Jabari Smith Jr.^	Houston Rockets (21)
2022–23	(United States) Jalen Williams^	Oklahoma City Thunder (17)	(Poland) Jeremy Sochan^	San Antonio Spurs (11)
2023–24	(France) **Victor Wembanyama**^	San Antonio Spurs (12)	(United States) Dereck Lively II^	Dallas Mavericks (11)
2023–24	(United States) Chet Holmgren^^{[n]}	Oklahoma City Thunder (18)	(United States) GG Jackson^	Memphis Grizzlies (16)
2023–24	(United States) Brandon Miller^	Charlotte Hornets (15)	(United States) Keyonte George^	Utah Jazz (13)
2023–24	(Mexico) Jaime Jaquez Jr.^	Miami Heat (14)	(United States) Amen Thompson^	Houston Rockets (22)
2023–24	(United States) Brandin Podziemski^	Golden State Warriors (22)	(United States) Cason Wallace^	Oklahoma City Thunder (19)
2024–25	(United States) **Stephon Castle**^	San Antonio Spurs (13)	(Lithuania) Matas Buzelis^	Chicago Bulls (26)
2024–25	(Canada) Zach Edey^	Memphis Grizzlies (17)	(United States) Bub Carrington^	Washington Wizards (23)
2024–25	(France) Zaccharie Risacher^	Atlanta Hawks (16)	(United States) Donovan Clingan^	Portland Trail Blazers (15)
2024–25	(France) Alex Sarr^	Washington Wizards (22)	(Cameroon) Yves Missi^	New Orleans Pelicans (8)
2024–25	(United States) Jaylen Wells^	Memphis Grizzlies (18)	(United States) Kel'el Ware^	Miami Heat (15)
2025–26	(United States) **Cooper Flagg**^	Dallas Mavericks (12)	(United States) Derik Queen^	New Orleans Pelicans (9)
2025–26	(United States) Kon Knueppel^	Charlotte Hornets (16)	(France) Maxime Raynaud^	Sacramento Kings (21)
2025–26	(The Bahamas) V. J. Edgecombe^	Philadelphia 76ers (20)	(United States) Jeremiah Fears^	New Orleans Pelicans (10)
2025–26	(United States) Dylan Harper^	San Antonio Spurs (14)	(United States) Ace Bailey^	Utah Jazz (14)
2025–26	(United States) Cedric Coward^	Memphis Grizzlies (19)	(United States) Collin Murray-Boyles^	Toronto Raptors (13)

== See also ==
- List of NBA regular season records

== Notes ==
- ^{a} Before the 1971–72 season, Lew Alcindor changed his name to Kareem Abdul-Jabbar.
- ^{b} When Olajuwon arrived in the United States, the University of Houston incorrectly spelled his first name "Akeem". Olajuwon used that spelling until March 9, 1991, when he announced that he would add an H.
- ^{c} David Robinson was originally drafted in 1987, but due to his active-duty obligation with the Navy, his rookie season did not begin until the 1989–90 season.
- ^{d} Richard Dumas was originally drafted in 1991, but due to drug violations, he was suspended for the entire 1991–92 season. His rookie season began in the 1992–93 season.
- ^{e} Ron Artest changed his name to Metta World Peace on September 16, 2011, and later Metta Sandiford-Artest in May 2020.
- ^{f} Amar'e Stoudemire's first name had previously been spelled incorrectly as "Amaré" or "Amare" since joining the NBA, but was changed to "Amar'e" in October 2008.
- ^{g} Nenê Hilario changed his name to simply Nenê on August 6, 2003.
- ^{h} Blake Griffin was drafted in 2009, but injured his left kneecap in a pre-season game before the 2009–10 season. He underwent surgery in January 2010 and missed the entire season. His rookie season began in the 2010–11 season.
- ^{i} Jonas Valančiūnas was drafted in 2011, but due partially to the 2011 NBA lockout, he spent the entire 2011–12 season in his home nation of Lithuania. His rookie season began in the 2012–13 season.
- ^{j} Nikola Jokić was drafted in 2014, but continued playing for KK Mega Basket during the 2014–15 season. His rookie season began in the 2015–16 season.
- ^{k} Joel Embiid was drafted in 2014, but injured his right foot and missed both the 2014–15 and 2015–16 seasons. His rookie season began in the 2016–17 season.
- ^{l} Ben Simmons was drafted in 2016, but injured his right foot and was ruled out of the entire season. His rookie season began in the 2017–18 season.
- ^{m} Bogdan Bogdanović was drafted in 2014, but opted to join Fenerbahçe and played for them until 2017. His rookie season began in the 2017–18 season.
- ^{n} Chet Holmgren was drafted in 2022, but injured his right foot and missed the entire season. His rookie season began in the 2023–24 season.
