= 1965–66 Duke Blue Devils men's basketball team =

American college basketball season

1965–66 Duke Blue Devils men's basketball

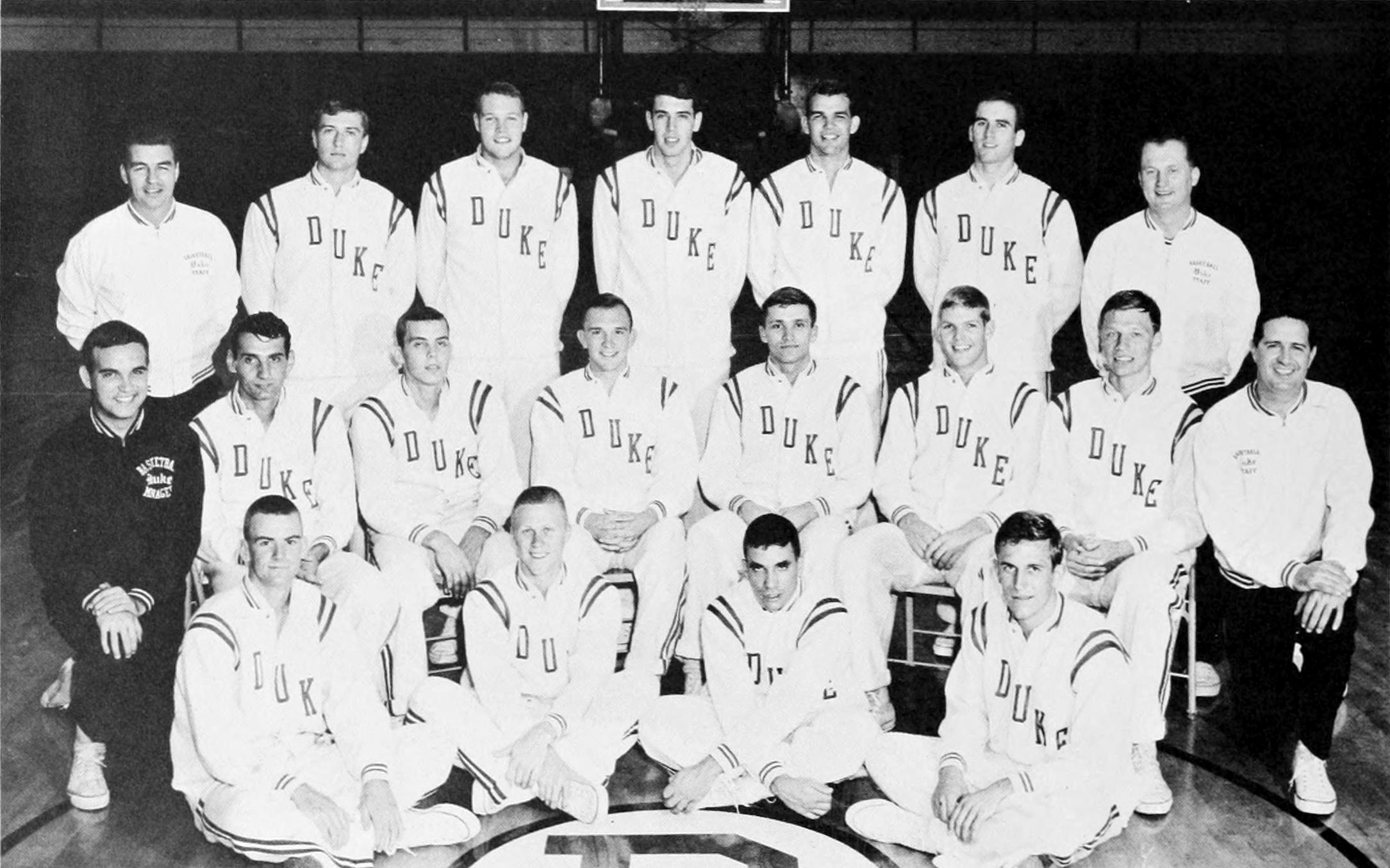

ACC Regular Season Champions ACC Tournament Champions

NCAA tournament, National Semifinals
- Conference: Atlantic Coast Conference

Ranking
- Coaches: No. 2
- AP: No. 2
- Record: 26–4 (12–2 ACC)
- Head coach: Vic Bubas (7th season)
- Home arena: Cameron Indoor Stadium

1965–66 ACC men's basketball standings
	Conf.				Overall
Team	W		L	PCT	W		L	PCT
No. 2 Duke †	12	–	2	.857	26	–	4	.867
NC State	9	–	5	.643	18	–	9	.667
Clemson	8	–	6	.571	15	–	10	.600
North Carolina	8	–	6	.571	16	–	11	.593
Maryland	7	–	7	.500	14	–	11	.560
South Carolina	4	–	10	.286	11	–	13	.458
Virginia	4	–	10	.286	7	–	15	.318
Wake Forest	4	–	10	.286	8	–	18	.308
† 1966 ACC tournament winner Rankings from AP Poll

The 1965–66 Duke Blue Devils men's basketball team represented Duke University in the 1965–66 NCAA Division I men's basketball season. Their head coach was Vic Bubas, and the team finished the season with an overall record of 26–4.

== Roster ==
1965–66 Duke Blue Devils men's basketball team
Players
Coaches

Pos.	#	Name	Height	Weight	Year	Previous school	Hometown
F	35	Phil Allen	6 ft 4 in (1.93 m)	195 lb (88 kg)	Sr	—	Syracuse, NY
G	12	Tony Barone	5 ft 8 in (1.73 m)	145 lb (66 kg)	So	—	Chicago, IL
C	54	Warren Chapman	6 ft 8 in (2.03 m)	220 lb (100 kg)	So	—	Seabrook, TX
F	40	Joe Kennedy	6 ft 6 in (1.98 m)	210 lb (95 kg)	So	DeMatha Catholic	Bowie, MD
F	31	Tim Kolodziej	6 ft 5 in (1.96 m)	205 lb (93 kg)	So	—	Amsterdam, NY
C	42	Mike Lewis	6 ft 7 in (2.01 m)	225 lb (102 kg)	So	—	Missoula, MT
F	32	Jim Liccardo	6 ft 5 in (1.96 m)	190 lb (86 kg)	Jr	—	West Orange, NJ
F	24	Jack Marin	6 ft 6 in (1.98 m)	200 lb (91 kg)	Sr	Farrell	Farrell, PA
G	21	Stuart McKaig	6 ft 1 in (1.85 m)	175 lb (79 kg)	Jr	—	Charlotte, NC
C	22	Bob Riedy	6 ft 6 in (1.98 m)	215 lb (98 kg)	Jr	—	Allentown, PA
G	33	Steve Vacendak	6 ft 1 in (1.85 m)	190 lb (86 kg)	Sr	—	Scranton, PA
G	34	Bob Verga	6 ft 0 in (1.83 m)	180 lb (82 kg)	Jr	St. Rose	Sea Girt, NJ
G	23	Dick Warren	5 ft 11 in (1.8 m)	150 lb (68 kg)	Fr	—	Charlotte, NC
G	22	Ron Wendelin	6 ft 1 in (1.85 m)	185 lb (84 kg)	So	—	Peoria, IL
G	14	Bill Zimmer	6 ft 0 in (1.83 m)	185 lb (84 kg)	Sr	—	Poland, OH

Head coach

- Vic Bubas

Assistant coach(es)

Legend

- (C) Team captain
- (S) Suspended
- (I) Ineligible
- (W) Walk-on
- Injured
- Current redshirt

Roster
Last update: 2016-Feb-15

== Schedule ==
Date time, TV	Rank^{#}	Opponent^{#}	Result	Record	Site city, state
Regular season
December 1, 1965*	No. 3	Virginia Tech	W 112–79	1–0	Greensboro Coliseum; Greensboro, NC
December 4, 1965	No. 3	Clemson	W 83–68	2–0 (1–0)	Cameron Indoor Stadium; Durham, NC
December 6, 1965	No. 6	No. 10 South Carolina	L 71–73	2–1 (1–1)	Carolina Fieldhouse; Columbia, SC
December 10, 1965*	No. 6	No. 1 UCLA	W 82–66	3–1 (1–1)	Cameron Indoor Stadium; Durham, NC
December 11, 1965*	No. 6	No. 1 UCLA	W 94–75	4–1 (1–1)	Charlotte Coliseum; Charlotte, NC
December 14, 1965*	No. 1	Furman	W 102–67	5–1 (1–1)	Cameron Indoor Stadium; Durham, NC
December 18, 1965	No. 1	Virginia	W 75–72	6–1 (2–1)	University Hall; Charlottesville, VA
December 21, 1965*	No. 1	No. 3 Michigan	W 100–93 ^{OT}	7–1 (2–1)	Cobo Arena; Detroit, MI
December 31, 1965*	No. 1	Notre Dame	W 95–73	8–1 (2–1)	Greensboro Coliseum; Greensboro, NC
January 1, 1966	No. 1	Wake Forest	W 92–76	9–1 (3–1)	Greensboro Coliseum; Greensboro, NC
January 3, 1966*	No. 1	Penn State	W 83–58	10–1 (3–1)	Cameron Indoor Stadium; Durham, NC
January 8, 1966	No. 1	North Carolina; Rivalry	W 88–77	11–1 (4–1)	Carmichael Auditorium; Chapel Hill, NC
January 11, 1966	No. 1	Clemson	W 87–85	12–1 (5–1)	Clemson Field House; Clemson, SC
January 13, 1966	No. 1	Maryland	W 76–61	13–1 (6–1)	Cameron Indoor Stadium; Durham, NC
January 15, 1966	No. 1	Wake Forest	W 101–81	14–1 (7–1)	Cameron Indoor Stadium; Durham, NC
January 29, 1966	No. 1	NC State	W 84–77	15–1 (8–1)	Cameron Indoor Stadium; Durham, NC
February 7, 1966*	No. 1	West Virginia	L 90–94	15–2 (8–1)	Charleston Civic Center; Charleston, WV
February 10, 1966	No. 2	NC State	W 78–74	16–2 (9–1)	Raleigh Memorial Auditorium; Raleigh, NC
February 12, 1966	No. 2	Virginia	W 81–55	17–2 (10–1)	Cameron Indoor Stadium; Durham, NC
February 14, 1966	No. 2	South Carolina	W 41–38	18–2 (11–1)	Cameron Indoor Stadium; Durham, NC
February 19, 1966	No. 2	Maryland	W 74–69	19–2 (12–1)	Cole Field House; College Park, MD
February 22, 1966	No. 2	Wake Forest	L 98–99 ^{OT}	19–3 (12–2)	Winston-Salem Coliseum; Winston-Salem, NC
February 26, 1966	No. 2	North Carolina; Rivalry	W 77–63	20–3 (13–2)	Cameron Indoor Stadium; Durham, NC
ACC tournament
March 3, 1966	(1) No. 3	Wake Forest; Quarterfinals	W 103–73	21–3	Reynolds Coliseum; Raleigh, NC
March 4, 1966	(1) No. 3	North Carolina; Semifinals/Rivalry	W 21–20	22–3	Reynolds Coliseum; Raleigh, NC
March 5, 1966	(1) No. 3	NC State; Championship	W 71–66	23–3	Reynolds Coliseum; Raleigh, NC
NCAA Tournament
March 11, 1966*	No. 2	vs. No. 10 Saint Joseph's; Regional semifinal	W 76–74	24–3	Reynolds Coliseum; Raleigh, NC
March 12, 1966*	No. 2	vs. Syracuse; Elite Eight	W 91–81	25–3	Reynolds Coliseum; Raleigh, NC
March 18, 1966*	No. 2	vs. No. 1 Kentucky; National semifinal	L 79–83	25–4	Cole Field House; College Park, MD
March 19, 1966*	No. 2	vs. Utah; Consolation	W 79–77	26–4	Cole Field House; College Park, MD
*Non-conference game. ^{#}Rankings from AP Poll. (#) Tournament seedings in parentheses. All times are in Eastern time.
