= 1963–64 Duke Blue Devils men's basketball team =

American college basketball season

1963–64 Duke Blue Devils men's basketball

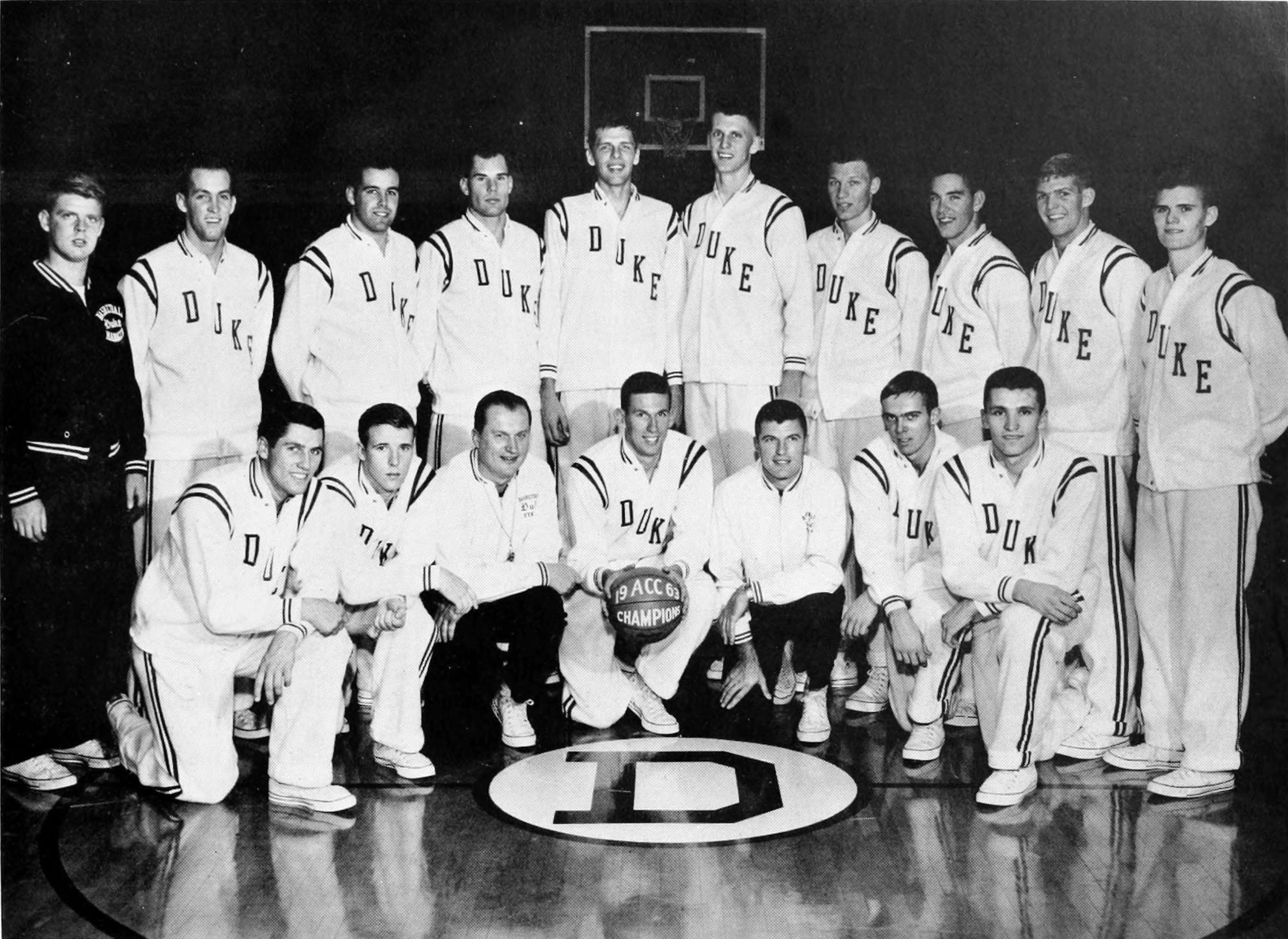

ACC Regular Season Champions ACC Tournament Champions NCAA Tournament, runner-up

National Championship Game, L 83-98 vs. UCLA
- Conference: Atlantic Coast Conference

Ranking
- Coaches: No. 4
- AP: No. 3
- Record: 26–5 (13–1 ACC)
- Head coach: Vic Bubas
- Assistant coaches: Chuck Daly; Bucky Waters
- Home arena: Cameron Indoor Stadium

1963–64 ACC men's basketball standings
	Conf.				Overall
Team	W		L	PCT	W		L	PCT
No. 3 Duke †	13	–	1	.929	26	–	5	.839
Wake Forest	9	–	5	.643	16	–	11	.593
Clemson	8	–	6	.571	13	–	12	.520
South Carolina	7	–	7	.500	10	–	14	.417
North Carolina	6	–	8	.429	12	–	12	.500
Maryland	5	–	9	.357	9	–	17	.346
Virginia	4	–	10	.286	8	–	16	.333
NC State	4	–	10	.286	8	–	11	.421
† 1964 ACC tournament winner Rankings from AP Poll

The 1963–64 Duke Blue Devils men's basketball team represented Duke University. The head coach was Vic Bubas. The team played its home games in the Cameron Indoor Stadium in Durham, North Carolina, and was a member of the Atlantic Coast Conference.

== Schedule ==
Date time, TV	Rank^{#}	Opponent^{#}	Result	Record	Site (attendance) city, state
November 30*		No. 4 Penn State	W 92–62	1–0	Cameron Indoor Stadium (8,200); Durham, North Carolina
December 6*	No. 4	vs. No. 7 Ohio State; West Virginia Centennial	W 76–75	2–0	(4,800); Morgantown, West Virginia
December 7*	No. 4	vs. West Virginia; West Virginia Centennial	W 86–81	3–0	(5,700); Morgantown, West Virginia
December 11*	No. 3	at Vanderbilt	L 92–97	3–1	Memorial Gymnasium (7,500); Nashville, Tennessee
December 14	No. 3	Clemson	W 75–52	4–1 (1–0)	Cameron Indoor Stadium (8,500); Durham, North Carolina
December 16	No. 3	at South Carolina	W 77–70	5–1 (2–0)	Carolina Coliseum (3,500); Columbia, South Carolina
December 19	No. 5	Virginia	W 84–73	6–1 (3–0)	Cameron Indoor Stadium (8,000); Durham, North Carolina
December 21*	No. 5	at No. 3 Michigan	L 67–83	6–2	(7,251); Ann Arbor, Michigan
December 30*	No. 8	vs. Auburn; Sugar Bowl Tournament	W 84–67	7–2	(6,700); New Orleans, Louisiana
December 31*	No. 9	vs. No. 1 Kentucky; Sugar Bowl Tournament	L 79–81	7–3	(6,700); New Orleans, Louisiana
January 4	No. 9	N.C. State	W 91–70	8–3 (4–0)	Cameron Indoor Stadium (8,800); Durham, North Carolina
January 8	No. 9	at Clemson	W 81–75	9–3 (5–0)	Littlejohn Coliseum (5,000); Clemson, South Carolina
January 11	No. 9	North Carolina; Rivalry	W 84–64	10–3 (6–0)	Cameron Indoor Stadium (8,800); Durham, North Carolina
January 25*	No. 8	vs. Tennessee	W 67–65 ^{2OT}	11–3	Greensboro Coliseum (9,147); Greensboro, North Carolina
January 30	No. 8	South Carolina	W 80–67	12–3 (7–0)	Cameron Indoor Stadium (8,200); Durham, North Carolina
February 1*	No. 8	Navy	W 121–63	13–3	Cameron Indoor Stadium (8,800); Durham, North Carolina
February 5	No. 7	at N.C. State	W 66–48	14–3 (8–0)	Reynolds Coliseum (9,100); Raleigh, North Carolina
February 8	No. 7	at Maryland; Rivalry	W 104–72	15–3 (9–0)	Cole Field House (11,600); College Park, Maryland
February 10	No. 7	at Virginia	W 80–59	16–3 (10–0)	University Hall (3,500); Charlottesville, Virginia
February 15*	No. 5	No. 4 Davidson	W 82–75	17–3	Cameron Indoor Stadium (8,800); Durham, North Carolina
February 18	No. 4	at Wake Forest	L 71–72	17–4 (10–1)	Winston-Salem Memorial Coliseum (8,300); Winston-Salem, North Carolina
February 22	No. 4	Maryland	W 84–63	18–4 (11–1)	Cameron Indoor Stadium (7,500); Durham, North Carolina
February 25	No. 4	Wake Forest	W 98–83	19–4 (12–1)	Cameron Indoor Stadium (7,500); Durham, North Carolina
February 29	No. 4	at North Carolina	W 104–69	20–4 (13–1)	Carmichael Auditorium (5,000); Chapel Hill, North Carolina
March 5*	No. 4	vs. N.C. State; ACC Tournament	W 75–44	21–4	Reynolds Coliseum (12,300); Raleigh, North Carolina
March 6*	No. 4	vs. North Carolina; ACC Tournament	W 65–49	22–4	Reynolds Coliseum (12,400); Raleigh, North Carolina
March 7*	No. 4	vs. Wake Forest; ACC Tournament	W 80–59	23–4	Reynolds Coliseum (12,400); Raleigh, North Carolina
March 13*	No. 3	vs. No. 7 Villanova; NCAA Tournament	W 87–73	24–4	Reynolds Coliseum (12,400); Raleigh, North Carolina
March 14*	No. 3	vs. Connecticut; NCAA Tournament	W 101–54	25–4	Reynolds Coliseum (12,400); Raleigh, North Carolina
March 20*	No. 3	vs. No. 2 Michigan; NCAA Tournament	W 91–80	26–4	Municipal Auditorium (10,731); Kansas City, Missouri
March 21*	No. 3	vs. No. 1 UCLA; NCAA Tournament	L 83–98	26–5	Municipal Auditorium (10,864); Kansas City, Missouri
*Non-conference game. ^{#}Rankings from AP Poll. (#) Tournament seedings in parentheses.

== Team players drafted into the NBA ==
Round	Pick	Player	NBA club
1	6	Jeff Mullins	St. Louis Hawks
8	68	Jay Buckley	Los Angeles Lakers
