= 1964 NCAA University Division basketball championship game =

1964 NCAA Tournament Championship Game
National championship game
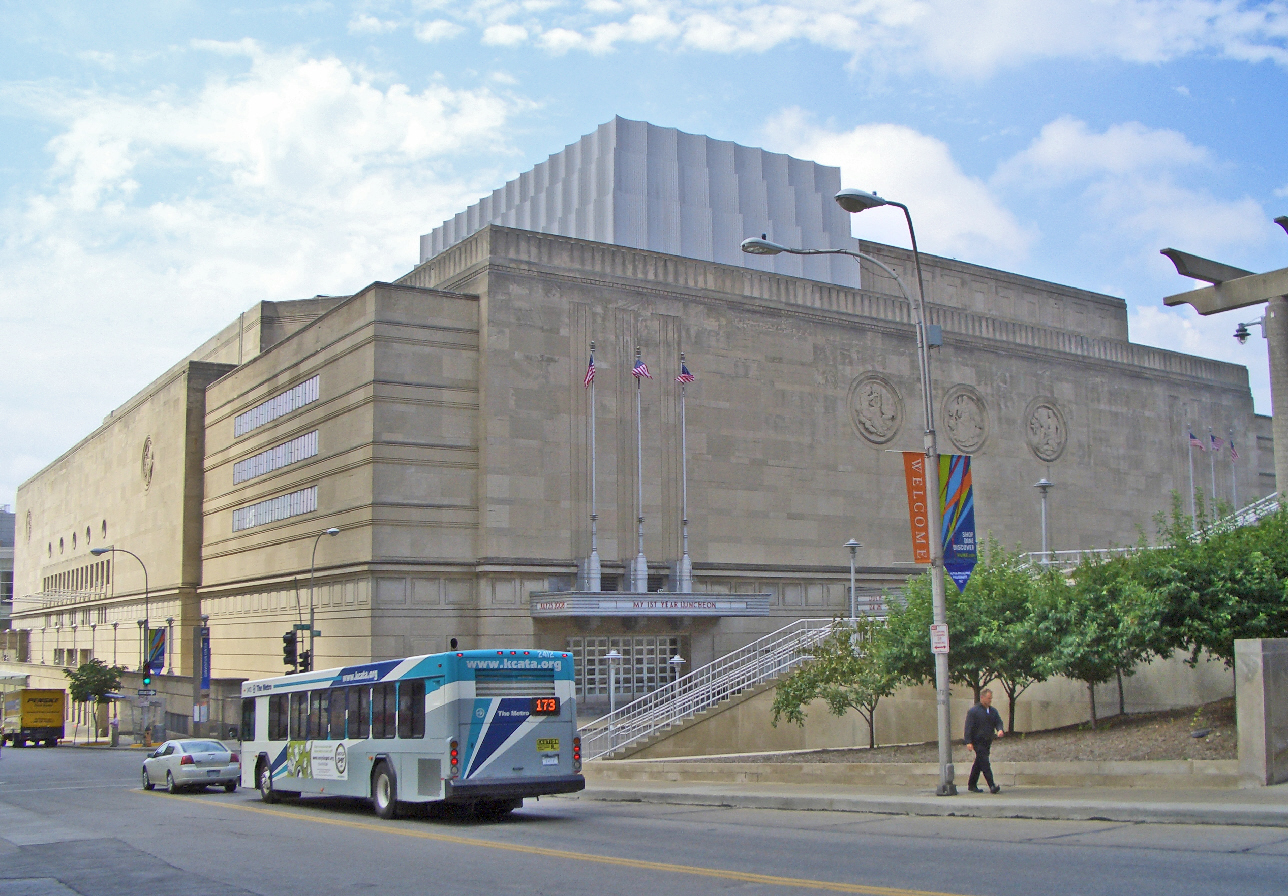
- The Municipal Auditorium in Kansas City, Missouri, hosted the championship game.
UCLA Bruins	Duke Blue Devils
AAWU	ACC
(29-0)	(26-4)
98	83
Head coach: John Wooden	Head coach: Vic Bubas
- AP: 1
- Coaches: 1
- AP: 4
- Coaches: 3
	1st half	2nd half	Total
UCLA Bruins	50	48	98
Duke Blue Devils	38	45	83
- Date: March 21, 1964
- Venue: Municipal Auditorium, Kansas City, Missouri
- MVP: Walt Hazzard, UCLA
- Attendance: 10,684

United States TV coverage
- Network: Sports Network Incorporated

The 1964 NCAA University Division Basketball Championship Game was the finals of the 1964 NCAA University Division basketball tournament and it determined the national champion for the 1963-64 NCAA University Division men's basketball season. The game was played on March 21, 1964, at the Municipal Auditorium in Kansas City, Missouri. It featured the UCLA Bruins of the Athletic Association of Western Universities, and the Duke Blue Devils of the Atlantic Coast Conference. This was the first championship game since 1959 to not feature a team from Ohio.

UCLA handily defeated Duke to win their first ever national championship, and it marked the start of a dynasty for the Bruins.

== Participating teams ==
=== UCLA Bruins ===
- West
  - UCLA 95, Seattle 90
  - UCLA 76, San Francisco 72
- Final Four
  - UCLA 90, Kansas State 84

=== Duke Blue Devils ===
- East
  - Duke 87, Villanova 73
  - Duke 101, Connecticut 54
- Final Four
  - Duke 91, Michigan 80

== Game summary ==
Sports Network Inc.

March 21, 1964

#1 UCLA Bruins 98, #4 Duke Blue Devils 83
Scoring by half: 50-38, 48-45
Pts: Gail Goodrich 27; Rebs: Kenny Washington 12; Asts: Walt Hazzard 8	Pts: Jeff Mullins 22; Rebs: Jack Marin 10; Asts: Denny Ferguson 4

Municipal Auditorium, Kansas City, Missouri
Attendance: 10,684
