= Jack Marin =

American basketball player (born 1944)

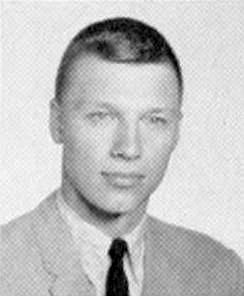
- Marin c. 1965

Personal information
- Born: October 12, 1944 (age 82) Sharon, Pennsylvania, U.S.
- Listed height: 6 ft 7 in (2.01 m)
- Listed weight: 200 lb (91 kg)

Career information
- High school: Farrell (Farrell, Pennsylvania)
- College: Duke (1963–1966)
- NBA draft: 1966: 1st round, 5th overall pick
- Drafted by: Baltimore Bullets
- Playing career: 1966–1977
- Position: Small forward
- Number: 15, 24, 42

Career history
- 1966–1972: Baltimore Bullets
- 1972–1974: Houston Rockets
- 1974–1975: Buffalo Braves
- 1975–1977: Chicago Bulls

Career highlights
- 2× NBA All-Star (1972, 1973); NBA All-Rookie First Team (1967); Consensus second-team All-American (1966); 2× First-team All-ACC (1965, 1966)

Career NBA statistics
- Points: 12,451 (14.8 ppg)
- Rebounds: 4,405 (5.8 rpg)
- Assists: 1,813 (2.1 apg)
- Stats at NBA.com
- Stats at Basketball Reference

John Warren Marin (/ˈmɛərɪn/ MAIR-in; born October 12, 1944) is an American former professional basketball player. A 6 ft 7 in (2.01 m) small forward from Duke University, Marin was named to the 1967 NBA All-Rookie Team and spent 11 seasons in the National Basketball Association (1966–1977), playing for the Baltimore Bullets, Houston Rockets, Buffalo Braves, and Chicago Bulls. The left-handed Marin was a two-time NBA All-Star and scored 12,541 points in his career. He led the NBA in free throw percentage during the 1971–72 NBA season.

Marin played college basketball for the Duke Blue Devils (1963 to 1966), and was a starting forward during his junior (1964–65) and senior (1965–66) seasons. He was a consensus second-team All-American in 1966. He was first-team All-Atlantic Coast Conference in 1965 and 1966. Marin's Duke teams went to the Final Four of the NCAA men's Division I basketball tournament in 1964 and 1966. He was named to the 1966 NCAA All-Tournament Team. Duke had a 46–9 record during Marin's two years as a starter, and the Associated Press ranked Duke No. 2 in 1966 and No. 10 in 1965.

== Early life ==
Marin was born on October 12, 1944, in Sharon, Pennsylvania. Marin attended Farrell High School in Mercer County, Pennsylvania, and was valedictorian of his high school class at Farrell High.

Marin played high school basketball at Farrell. As a senior in 1961–1962, he was named first-team All-State, after scoring 529 points and leading Farrell to the league title. He had also been All-State in 1960–61. In 1962, the coaches of Section 3 of the Western Pennsylvania Interscholastic Athletic League (WPIAL), along with writers covering the league, named Marin the WPIAL's most valuable player. He was a unanimous choice as first-team All-Section 3. Marin had been selected to the All-Section 3 second team in his junior year. Marin was 6 ft 5 in (1.96 m) in high school, but played guard on a team with a 5 ft 10 in (1.78 m) center because the left-handed Marin was the only player on the team who could consistently make outside shots.

== College career ==
65 colleges and universities expressed an interest in Marin attending their schools. Marin chose to attend Duke University on a basketball scholarship, playing under coach Vic Bubas. As Marin's Duke career progressed, Bubas described him as the most complete player Bubas had ever coached. Marin played from 1963 to 1966 on Duke's varsity team.

As a sophomore reserve forward (1963–64), Marin played in all 31 of Duke's games that season, averaging 7.9 points and 4.7 rebounds per game. Duke was 26–5 that season, and reached the final game of the NCAA Division I men's basketball tournament, losing to UCLA in the championship game. Marin's best game of the tournament came in the championship game against UCLA, where he scored 16 points. In Duke's East Regional semifinal victory over Villanova, Marin had eight points and five rebounds.

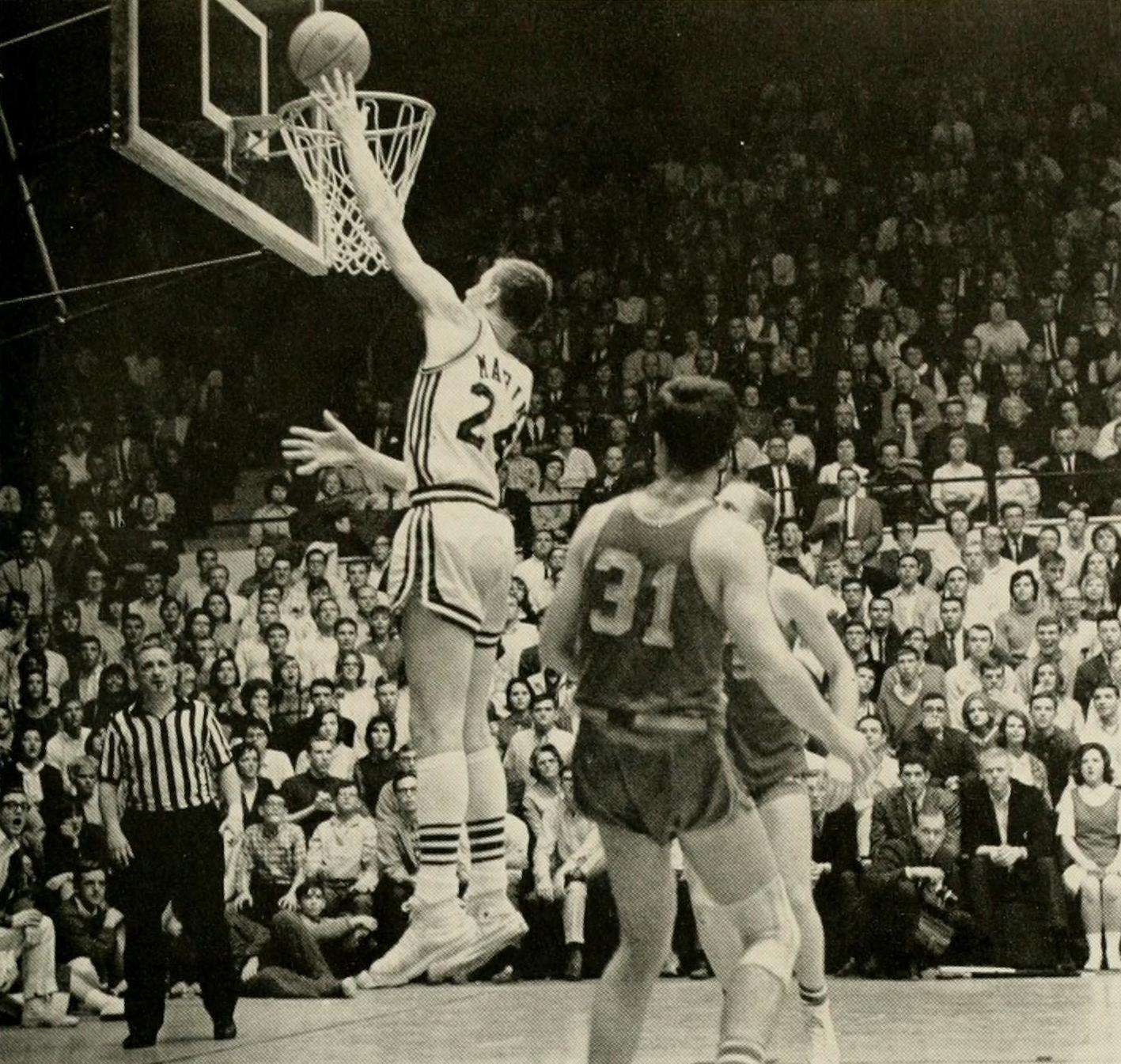
Marin making a lay-up for Duke in 1965

Marin became a starting forward as a junior (1964–65). He averaged 19.1 points and 10.3 rebounds per game, and led the Atlantic Coast Conference (ACC) in field goal percentage. Duke was the regular season champion in the ACC, but lost in the 1965 ACC men's basketball tournament championship game to North Carolina State (NC State), and did not participate in that season's NCAA tournament.

Duke defeated the South Carolina Gamecocks in the first round of the ACC tournament, with Marin making the game winning basket. Duke then defeated Wake Forest, 101–81, with Marin scoring 20 points. In the championship game against NC state, played at Reynolds Coliseum in Raleigh, Marin got into foul trouble early in the second half, limiting his playing time. Duke lost 91–85, with Marin scoring 10 points. Marin was selected first-team All-ACC in 1965, and named to the second-team of the All-ACC Tournament Team. The Associated Press (AP) ranked the 20–5 Duke team No. 10 in the 1964–65 season.

Duke had a 26–4 record in the 1965–66 season, Marin's senior year. Duke won the ACC regular season and the ACC tournament, and went to the Final Four of the 1966 NCAA tournament. Marin led Duke in scoring (18.6 points per game) and rebounding (9.7 rebounds per game) that season. Marin was a consensus second-team All American. The Associated Press named him a second-team All-American, and United Press International (UPI) named him a third-team All-American. He was once again first-team All-ACC, and second-team ACC All-Tournament Team.

Duke's second game of the 1966 ACC tournament was against the North Carolina Tar Heels. Tar Heels' coach Dean Smith used a strategy of having his players dribble and pass for long periods of time without shooting, in an effort to compete against a superior Duke team. North Carolina did not take its first shot until over four minutes of game-time had passed, and only made one field goal in the first half. Duke won the game 21–20. Marin was Duke's second leading scorer in the game with five points. One sportswriter said at the time "The delay became so tiresome that Duke's Jack Marin stood in a corner and lackadaisically clapped in a slow rhythm". Marin scored 15 points in Duke's victory over North Carolina State in the ACC tournament's championship game, 71–66.

Duke defeated No.5 ranked St. Joseph's University of Philadelphia in the East Regional semifinals of the 1966 NCAA tournament, 76–74. Marin had 18 points, 15 rebounds, and made four foul shots with 25 seconds left in the game, including two one-and-ones, to secure the victory. Duke next defeated Syracuse in the East Regional final, 91–81. Marin led Duke with 22 points, and had nine rebounds. Duke lost to Kentucky in the Final Four, 83–79. Marin led Duke with 29 points. Duke defeated Utah for third place in the tournament, 79–77. Marin again led Duke in scoring, with 23 points. Duke finished the 1965–66 season ranked No. 2 by the Associated Press. Marin was named to the 1966 NCAA All-Tournament Team, and to the East's All-Region Team.

Marin was nicknamed "Mr. Consistency" as a Duke player. In 1966, he also was named to the ACC's All-Academic team. He received an A.B. degree in chemistry from Duke.

== Professional career ==
=== Baltimore Bullets ===
==== Reserve years (1966 to 1968) ====
In 1966, Marin had been accepted into Duke's medical school, but decided to pursue professional basketball, and was drafted and signed by the Baltimore Bullets in 1966. Marin was the fifth player taken in the 1966 NBA draft. As a rookie (1966–67), Marin played in 74 games, playing nearly 18 minutes per game behind starting small forward Gus Johnson. Marin averaged 9.6 points, 4.2 rebounds and one assist per game. The Bullets finished the season 20–61, last in the NBA's Eastern Division. He was selected to the first-team 1967 All-Rookie Team.

The next season (1967–68), Marin averaged 24.8 minutes, 13.5 points, 5.8 rebounds, and 1.3 assists per game, still playing behind Johnson at small forward. Rookie of the Year Earl Monroe joined the team that season; which the Bullets finished 36–46 (still last in the Eastern Division). The Bullets protected Marin from being available in the 1968 NBA expansion draft.

==== Starting player ====
Even though reporting to training camp, Marin delayed signing his contract in September 1968 in connection with his unhappiness at being used as a reserve instead of a starter. After experimenting with Marin as a shooting guard in the 1968–69 preseason, Marin became a starter at small forward in the season's third game, and was regularly playing over 30 minutes a game by the end of October. Johnson played power forward (though only in 49 games that season because of torn knee ligaments in early February that ended his season).

1968–69 Rookie of the Year and NBA Most Valuable Player Wes Unseld joined the team that season at center, with a starting lineup now consisting of Marin, Johnson, Unseld, Monroe and Kevin Loughery. Johnson, Monroe and Unseld were all future Naismith Basketball Hall of Fame members. That Bullets team went 57–25, finishing in first place in the Eastern Division. Marin played in all 82 games, averaging 33 minutes, 15.9 points, 7.4 rebounds, and 2.8 assists per game. The New York Knicks swept the Bullets (without Johnson) in four games in the Eastern Division semifinals, Marin averaging 38.3 minutes, 13.8 points, 4.5 rebounds, and three assists per game in that series.

In the 1969–70 season, the Bullets started Marin, Johnson, Unseld, Monroe, and Loughery. Marin played in all 82 games, playing 35.9 minutes per game. He averaged 19.7 points, 6.5 rebounds, and 2.6 assists per game. He scored 41 points on February 27, 1970 against the Atlanta Hawks, 18 in the first period, despite being involved in a fight with Hawks' forward Bill Bridges. Marin scored the majority of his points after the fight. The Bullets once again played the Knicks in the Eastern Division semifinals that season, losing in seven games. Marin averaged 37.9 minutes, 17.9 points, 6.7 rebounds, and 3.1 assists against the eventual 1970 NBA champion Knicks.

==== 1970-71 season ====
Marin played in all 82 games again in the 1970–71 season. He averaged 35.6 minutes, 18.8 points, 6.3 rebounds, and 2.6 assists per game; and had an .848 free throw percentage. On November 7, 1971, Marin scored a career-high 42 points in a 109–106 loss to his later team, the Houston Rockets. The Bullets were 42–40 that season, but reached the 1971 NBA Finals. In 18 playoff games, Marin played 41.7 minutes per game (second only to Wes Unseld on the team), and averaged 20.6 points per game (second only to Earl Monroe on the team). He averaged 8.1 rebounds and 3.1 assists per game. His minutes played, scoring, and rebounding averages were all career playoff highs.

The Bullets first won the Eastern Conference semifinals over the 47–35 Philadelphia 76ers in seven games. Marin averaged 20.6 points, 9.4 rebounds, and 3.6 assists per game against the 76ers. His 40.9 minutes per game led the team. In the deciding Game 7 win, 128–120, Marin led the Bullets with 33 points, and had 16 rebounds and four assists. The Bullets then played the 52–30 New York Knicks in the Eastern Conference finals, having lost to the Knicks in the playoffs the previous two seasons. The Bullets upset the defending NBA champions in seven games, winning Game 7, 93–91.

In the 1971 playoff series against the Knicks, Marin averaged 42.6 minutes, 21.9 points, 8.3 rebounds, and three assists per game. The Baltimore Sun sportswriter Alan Goldstein described Marin as "the most consistent performer for the Bullets in the series". In a Game 4 Bullets' win, Marin led the Bullets with 27 points. In Gus Johnson's absence, Marin also had 14 rebounds. Baltimore sportswriter Bill Tanton call it Marin's greatest game in five years with the Bullets. In a series tying win in Game 6, Marin scored 22 points and Bullets' assistant coach Bob Ferry said it was the best game Marin had ever played. Marin reportedly had been outplaying Knicks' small forward Bill Bradley in the series, and Knicks' coach Red Holzman replaced Bradley with Cazzie Russell during Game 6 in an effort to limit Marin's scoring. Marin scored eight quick points against Russell, and Bradley returned to the game.

In the deciding Game 7 win, Marin played 46 minutes (more than any other Bullets player), and scored 20 points. He also had nine rebounds and three assists. With the Bullets ahead 89–88, Marin got an offensive rebound and put in a critical field goal to put the Bullets ahead by three points, 91–88, with less than two minutes to play in the game. On the game's last play Bullets' coach Gene Shue made a defensive switch to have the 6 ft 7 in (2.01 m) Marin cover the 6 ft 4 in (1.93 m) Dick Barnett, the Knicks' leading scorer in the game, to stop Barnett from having a shooting opportunity. The Bullets won the game on the Knicks' home court, Madison Square Garden. After the game Marin said, "'I'd rather have won here than anywhere else in the world'".

The Bullets lost 1971 NBA championship series in four games to the Milwaukee Bucks, a team that included future Hall of Famers Kareem Abdul-Jabbar, Oscar Robertson, and Bob Dandridge. The Bucks reached the NBA finals after defeating the San Francisco Warriors in five games and then the Los Angeles Lakers in five games. The Bullets began the series just two days after defeating the Knicks; and team leading rebounder Gus Johnson missed two games and was limited in the other two because of knee injuries. Marin led the Bullets in scoring against the Bucks, averaging 18.3 points per game. He had a .900 free throw percentage, and averaged 41.5 minutes, 5.3 rebounds, and 2.5 assists per game.

==== All-Star season ====
Marin played in 78 games the following season (1971–72). He averaged 37.5 minutes, 22.3 points, 6.8 rebounds, and 2.2 assists per game. His 22.3 points per game was a career high. Marin's .894 free throw percentage led the NBA. He was selected to play for the East team in the 1972 NBA All-Star Game, where he scored 11 points in 15 minutes of play. For the fourth consecutive season, the Bullets played the Knicks in the playoffs, losing in six games in the Eastern Conference semifinals. Marin averaged 38.7 minutes, 17.2 points, six rebounds, and two assists per game in that series.

==== Rivalry with Bill Bradley and New York Knicks ====
Marin started for the Baltimore Bullets in the playoffs from 1969 to 1972, facing the New York Knicks in each of those four post-seasons. The Bullets-Knicks playoff rivalry was one of the fiercest in the NBA. Within the overall rivalry between the two teams there were fierce individual matchups between players repeatedly competing against each other. This included an annual matchup battle between Marin and the Knicks' small forward Bill Bradley, a future Naismith Basketball Hall of Fame inductee and United States Senator. Hall of Fame Knicks' coach Red Holzman described Marin and Bradley as "two intense players in a matchup of skills and the will to win". Ten years after his last Bullets-Knicks playoff matchup Marin said, "'The several series against New York were probably the highlights of my career . . . There was something at that point in the game that was intellectual as well as physical'".

Holzman said in his memoir, My Unforgettable Season 1970, that Marin would frequently complain to the referees about Bradley's defense on Marin (which Bradley thought was unwarranted), and that Bradley knew how to use various strategies (physical and verbal) to get Marin angry and distracted during games. Holzman wrote of this, "Bradley would drive Marin crazy and I enjoyed it because it would give us an edge in that matchup". From Marin's perspective Bradley pushed and grabbed Marin excessively on defense. Ten years after their last Bullets-Knicks playoff game, Marin said "'Bill was as tenacious as anybody I've ever played against . . . He pushed and shoved and held a lot, but I suppose I did the same to him. It was a very, very intense matchup, probably the most intense of my career'".

Marin was in a number of fist fights during his NBA career, including a fight with Bradley's Knicks' teammate Phil Jackson during the 1972 playoffs. That fight included, among other things, a Jackson elbow that had Marin bleeding from the head; and Marin punching Jackson, knocking Jackson to the floor (resulting in Marin's fouling out of that game). Marin and Bradley never came to blows in that manner during their years of competition against each other.

Marin played in 480 games with the Bullets over six seasons, and was a starter in his last four seasons with the Bullets. Over his Bullets' career, he averaged 31 minutes, 16.7 points, 6.2 rebounds, and 2.1 assists per game. He had an .838 free throw percentage.

=== Houston Rockets, Buffalo Braves and Chicago Bulls ===
On June 23, 1972, the Bullets traded Marin to the Houston Rockets for future Hall of Fame center/forward Elvin Hayes (along with future considerations). In his one full season with the Rockets (1972–73), Marin averaged 18.5 points per game, and was selected to play in the NBA All-Star for a second consecutive year.

In 1973–74, however, he was no longer a full-time starter for the Rockets after suffering an ankle injury. Unhappy about his status with the Rockets, averaging less than 25 minutes a game, Marin was traded along with Matt Goukas to the Buffalo Braves after 47 games, for Kevin Kunnert and Dave Wohl. He had a 10.7 points per game average for the Rockets at the time.

Marin finished the season in Buffalo averaging 13.4 points and 25.2 minutes per game. He never became a full-time starter again in the NBA, and never averaged more than 11.8 points per game in a season for the rest of his career. Marin played the full 1974-75 season for the Braves. In 81 games, he averaged 26.5 minutes, 11.8 points, 4.5 rebounds, and 1.6 assists per game; with an .869 free throw percentage. The Braves lost in the Eastern Conference semifinals to the Washington Bullets in seven games. Marin played in all seven games, averaging 15.4 minutes, 5.3 points, 2.4 rebounds and 1.1 assists per game.

Marin began the 1975–76 season with the Braves, playing in 12 games, averaging 23.2 minutes and 9.1 points per game. In late November 1975, the Braves traded Marin to the Chicago Bulls for future considerations. He played in 67 games for the Bulls that season, averaging 24.3 minutes, 11 points, 3.2 rebounds, and 1.8 assists per game. Marin played his final NBA season with the Bulls in 1976–77. He appeared in 54 regular season games, averaging 16.1 minutes and 6.8 points per game.

Marin played the final three NBA games of his career in the 1977 first round Western Conference playoffs, a three-game loss to the Portland Trail Blazers (the eventual NBA champions that season). Marin averaged 17.7 minutes and 5.3 points per game. Marin was interested in playing one more year with the Bulls; and approached the team, willing to play for more modest contract terms than he played for in 1976–77. However, he believed that the Bulls were not credibly interested in retaining him going into the next season, based on the team's offer to sign him at a 60 percent pay cut. Marin chose to enter law school in the fall of 1978, rather than trying to return to the NBA for another season.

For his 11-year NBA career, Marin averaged 14.8 points, 2.1 assists and 5.2 rebounds per game. In 51 playoff games, he also averaged 14.8 points per game, 2.4 assists and 5.5 rebounds. Marin had an .843 career free throw percentage, ranking him 94th all-time in NBA history and 98th all-time in NBA/ABA history (through the 2025–26 season).

== Legacy and honors ==
While Marin was still playing at Duke, coach Vic Bubas, who had been coaching Duke since the 1959–60 season, said Marin was the most complete player he had ever coached. In 1966, Hall of Fame coach Dean Smith called Marin the most underrated player in the ACC and possibly the nation. In addition to being an NCAA All-America player, an All-ACC player, an NBA All-Rookie Team member, and an NBA All-Star, in 1978, Marin was inducted into the Duke Athletics Hall of Fame. In 1998, he was inducted into the North Carolina Sports Hall of Fame. In 1997, Marin was inducted into the Mercer County, Pennsylvania Hall of Fame, being described as the most successful athlete ever from the county. He has also been inducted into the Pennsylvania Sports Hall of Fame. In May 2026, he was named as a member of the Croatian American Sports Hall of Fame class of 2026.

== Legal and political career ==
After retiring from the NBA, Marin entered Duke University Law School and graduated with his Juris Doctor in 1980. In 1982, he was the Republican candidate for U.S. Congressional District 2 in North Carolina against Democratic incumbent Rep. Tim Valentine. Though he spent a competitive amount for that time ($169,610) he lost the general election with 31 percent of the vote. Before his retirement from the law, Marin was a partner in the Richmond, Virginia-based law firm of Williams Mullen where he focused his practice on sports law. He acted as outside counsel to the National Basketball Retired Players Association, and also represented basketball players performing abroad. He also worked at the Raleigh firm Maupin Taylor Ellis & Adams, where he represented NBA players as a sports agent. Marin served on the Chief Justice of North Carolina's Task Force on ACEs-Informed Courts.

== Personal life ==
Marin helped found the Celebrity Players Tour (CPT) in 1996, a small stakes golf tour for celebrities and notable figures, acting both as an administrator and a player, and eventually becoming its head. Marin served as the CPT's executive director (1998 to 2000). During his tenure, the tour grew from five or eight events to 15 events, that support various charities around the country. The purse for winning players in an individual tournament was up to at least $500,000 in 2000. Marin has been a playing member (and a winning golfer on the CPT tour, earning a sixth best $52,754 on the CPT tour in 1998). He has served on its board of directors.

Marin is currently (2026) involved with the United States Marine Corps and Hope For The Warriors, a non-profit based out of Jacksonville, North Carolina, where he has been chairman of the board. He teaches golf and other sports activities to United States Marines who were severely wounded in combat. He currently serves on the Be Active North Carolina Campaign Cabinet.

== NBA career statistics ==
Legend
GP	Games played	GS	Games started	MPG	Minutes per game
FG%	Field goal percentage	3P%	3-point field goal percentage	FT%	Free throw percentage
RPG	Rebounds per game	APG	Assists per game	SPG	Steals per game
BPG	Blocks per game	PPG	Points per game	**Bold**	Career high

=== Regular season ===
Year	Team	GP	MPG	FG%	FT%	RPG	APG	STL	BLK	PPG
1966–67	Baltimore	74	17.9	.448	.775	4.2	1.0	–	–	9.6
1967–68	Baltimore	**82**	24.8	.460	.796	5.8	1.3	–	–	13.5
1968–69	Baltimore	**82**	33.0	.455	.830	**7.4**	2.8	–	–	15.9
1969–70	Baltimore	**82**	35.9	.489	.844	6.5	2.6	–	–	19.7
1970–71	Baltimore	**82**	35.6	.460	.848	6.3	2.6	–	–	18.8
1971–72	Baltimore	78	**37.5**	.478	**.894***	6.8	2.2	–	–	**22.3**
1972–73	Houston	81	37.3	.468	.849	6.2	**3.6**	–	–	18.5
1973–74	Houston	47	23.4	.474	.837	2.3	2.6	.5	.2	10.7
1973–74	Buffalo	27	25.2	**.545**	.877	4.5	1.7	**.9**	**.7**	13.4
1974–75	Buffalo	81	26.5	.455	.869	4.5	1.6	.6	.2	11.8
1975–76	Buffalo	12	23.2	.436	.818	3.3	1.9	.6	.5	9.1
1975–76	Chicago	67	24.3	.421	.865	3.2	1.8	.6	.1	11.0
1976–77	Chicago	54	16.1	.465	.795	1.7	1.1	.2	.1	6.8
Career		849	29.0	.465	.843	5.2	2.1	.5	.2	14.8
All-Star		2	13.0	.500	1.000	2.0	1.0	–	–	7.5

=== Playoffs ===
Year	Team	GP	MPG	FG%	FT%	RPG	APG	STL	BLK	PPG
1969	Baltimore	4	38.3	.471	.636	4.5	3.0	–	–	13.8
1970	Baltimore	7	37.9	.421	.853	6.7	**3.1**	–	–	17.9
1971	Baltimore	**18**	**41.7**	.461	.817	**8.1**	**3.1**	–	–	**20.6**
1972	Baltimore	6	38.2	.397	**.872**	6.0	2.0	–	–	17.2
1974	Buffalo	6	20.2	.468	.778	3.2	1.3	.3	.0	8.5
1975	Buffalo	7	15.4	.444	.867	2.4	1.1	**1.0**	**.1**	5.3
1977	Chicago	3	17.7	**.615**	.000	.3	.7	.0	.0	5.3
Career		51	32.9	.450	.824	5.5	2.4	.6	.1	14.8
