= 1966 ACC men's basketball tournament =

- Classification: Division I
- Season: 1965–66
- Teams: 8
- Site: Reynolds Coliseum; Raleigh, North Carolina
- Champions: Duke (4th title)
- Winning coach: Vic Bubas (4th title)
- MVP: Steve Vacendak (Duke)

1965–66 ACC men's basketball standings
	Conf.				Overall
Team	W		L	PCT	W		L	PCT
No. 2 Duke †	12	–	2	.857	26	–	4	.867
NC State	9	–	5	.643	18	–	9	.667
Clemson	8	–	6	.571	15	–	10	.600
North Carolina	8	–	6	.571	16	–	11	.593
Maryland	7	–	7	.500	14	–	11	.560
South Carolina	4	–	10	.286	11	–	13	.458
Virginia	4	–	10	.286	7	–	15	.318
Wake Forest	4	–	10	.286	8	–	18	.308
† 1966 ACC tournament winner Rankings from AP Poll

The 1966 Atlantic Coast Conference men's basketball tournament was held in Raleigh, North Carolina, at Reynolds Coliseum from March 3–5, 1966. Duke defeated NC State, 71–66, to win the championship for the fourth time. Steve Vacendak of Duke was named tournament MVP. This was the last ACC Tournament held at Reynolds Coliseum.

Duke defeated all three of their in-state rivals on their way to the tournament championship, beating Wake Forest in the quarterfinal round, North Carolina in the semifinal, and NC State in the championship game.

== Bracket ==
Quarterfinals; March 3
1	#3 Duke	103
8	Wake Forest	73
4	North Carolina	77
5	Maryland	70
2	NC State	86
7	Virginia	77
3	Clemson	52
6	South Carolina	60

Semifinals; March 4
1	#3 Duke	21
4	North Carolina	20
2	NC State	75
6	South Carolina	62

Championship Game; March 5
1	#3 Duke	71
2	NC State	66
