= ACC Coach of the Year =

ACC Coach of the Year may refer to:

- ACC Football Coach of the Year
- ACC Men's Basketball Coach of the Year
