= Jack Marin (disambiguation) =

Jack or John Marin may refer to:

- Jack Marin (musician), American musician
- Jack Marin, John Marin, American basketball player
- John Marin, artist
