= Murray Greason =

American basketball and baseball coach (1900–1960)

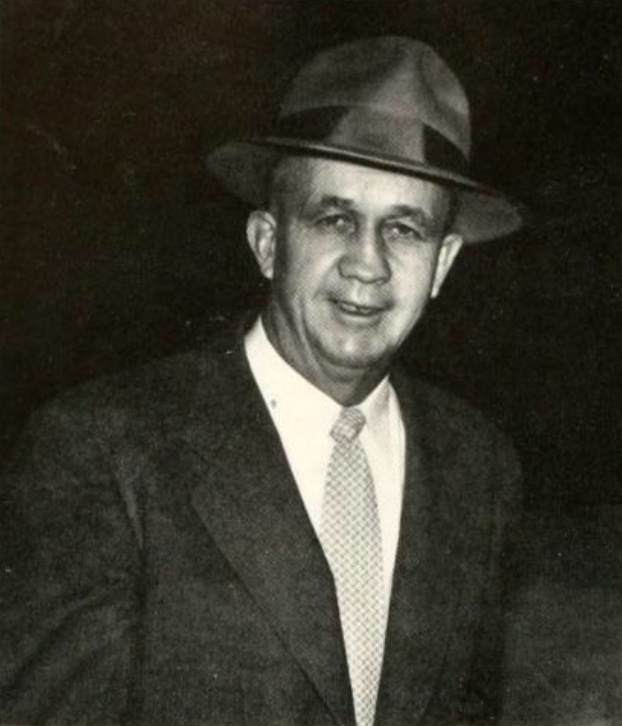
- Greason in the 1953 Howler

Biographical details
- Born: December 26, 1900; Raleigh, North Carolina, U.S.
- Died: January 1, 1960 (aged 59); Greensboro, North Carolina, U.S.

Playing career

Football
- 1922–1925: Wake Forest

Basketball
- 1922–1926: Wake Forest
- Position: Halfback (football)

Coaching career (HC unless noted)

Basketball
- 1926–1933: Lexington HS
- 1934–1957: Wake Forest

Baseball
- 1939–1942: Wake Forest
- 1945–1947: Wake Forest

Head coaching record
- Overall: 285–243 (college basketball); 44–37–2 (college baseball)

Accomplishments and honors

Championships
- Basketball; SoCon regular season (1939); SoCon Tournament (1953)

Awards
- Basketball; SoCon Coach of the Year (1953); ACC Coach of the Year (1956)

Murray Crossley Greason (December 26, 1900 – January 1, 1960) was an American college basketball and baseball coach. He earned 12 athletic letters as a student-athlete at Wake Forest University in baseball, basketball and football from 1922 to 1926.

After graduation, Greason became a coach at Lexington High School in North Carolina. In 1934, he became head basketball coach at his alma mater, Wake Forest, to start a tenure that would last 23 seasons, during which time he compiled a record of 288–244. Greason won a Southern Conference regular season title in 1939, and a tournament title in 1953. He was also named Southern Conference Coach of the Year that season. He led Wake Forest into the Atlantic Coast Conference as a charter member in 1954 and in 1956 was named ACC Coach of the Year. Greason also coached the Wake Forest baseball team from 1940 to 1947.

Greason was killed in an automobile accident on January 1, 1960.

== Head coaching record ==
=== College basketball ===
Record table
Season	Team	Overall	Conference	Standing	Postseason
Wake Forest Demon Deacons (Independent) (1933–1936)
1933–34	Wake Forest	5–9			
1934–35	Wake Forest	6–10			
1935–36	Wake Forest	9–12			
Wake Forest Demon Deacons (Southern Conference) (1936–1953)
1936–37	Wake Forest	15–6	9–4	3rd	
1937–38	Wake Forest	7–12	7–8	9th	
1938–39	Wake Forest	18–6	15–3	1st	NCAA Elite Eight
1939–40	Wake Forest	13–9	10–5	4th	
1940–41	Wake Forest	9–9	7–6	8th	
1941–42	Wake Forest	16–8	13–5	3rd	
1942–43	Wake Forest	1–10	1–10	14th	
1944–45	Wake Forest	3–14	0–6	13th	
1945–46	Wake Forest	12–6	8–5	4th	
1946–47	Wake Forest	11–13	8–9	11th	
1947–48	Wake Forest	18–11	8–7	T–8th	
1948–49	Wake Forest	11–13	7–7	T–7th	
1949–50	Wake Forest	14–16	11–8	7th	
1950–51	Wake Forest	16–14	8–9	T–10th	
1951–52	Wake Forest	10–19	7–9	10th	
1952–53	Wake Forest	19–6	12–3	2nd	NCAA Sweet 16
Wake Forest Demon Deacons (Atlantic Coast Conference) (1953–1957)
1953–54	Wake Forest	17–12	8–4	3rd	
1954–55	Wake Forest	17–12	8–6	4th	
1955–56	Wake Forest	19–9	10–4	3rd	
1956–57	Wake Forest	19–9	7–7	4th	
Wake Forest:		285–243 (.540)	164–125 (.567)		
Total:		285–243 (.540)			
National champion Postseason invitational champion Conference regular season champion Conference regular season and conference tournament champion Division regular season champion Division regular season and conference tournament champion Conference tournament champion
