= Atlantic Coast Conference Men's Basketball Coach of the Year =

Award for Basketball Coaches in the Atlantic Coast Conference

ACC Men's Basketball Coach of the Year
- Awarded for: the most outstanding men's basketball head coach in the Atlantic Coast Conference
- Country: United States
- Presented by: Atlantic Coast Sports Media Association (1954–present); ACC head coaches (2013–present)

History
- First award: 1954
- Most recent: Jon Scheyer, Duke

The Atlantic Coast Conference Men's Basketball Coach of the Year is a basketball award given to head coaches in the Atlantic Coast Conference (ACC). The award is granted to the head coach voted to be the most successful that season by members of the Atlantic Coast Sports Media Association, and since the 2012–13 season has also been awarded in separate voting by the league's coaches. The award was first given following the 1953–54 season, the first year of the conference's existence, to Everett Case of NC State. The first winner of the coaches' award was Jim Larrañaga of Miami (FL)^{a} in 2013.

Dean Smith of North Carolina has won the most awards with eight, followed by Mike Krzyzewski of Duke, with five, and Tony Bennett of Virginia, with four. Fourteen coaches in total have won the award more than once. Fourteen coaches have also won the award in the same season that they have also won a National Coach of the Year award; of those, only Krzyzewski and Smith have achieved the feat three times. Five coaches have won during the same season that they have coached a team that won the NCAA Tournament Championship: Tony Bennett, Frank McGuire, Norm Sloan, Dean Smith, and Gary Williams. McGuire is the only head coach to win the award at two different schools (North Carolina and South Carolina).

Each of the original (1953) ACC members have had at least one of their coaches win the award. Among schools that joined the ACC before 2013, Boston College is the only one that has never had a winning coach. Thirty-one different coaches from twelve schools have received the award. North Carolina has the most ACC Coach of the Year awards with twelve, while its in-state rival, Duke, is second with ten. Each school of Tobacco Road (including NC State and Wake Forest) has won at least seven awards, as has Virginia with eight.

== Key ==
| | Awarded one of the following National Coach of the Year awards that year: Associated Press Coach of the Year (AP); Adolph Rupp Cup (ARC); Basketball Times Coach of the Year (BT); CBS/Chevrolet Coach of the Year (CBS); Naismith Coach of the Year (N); NABC Coach of the Year (NABC); Sporting News Coach of the Year (SN); United Press International Coach of the Year (UPI); U.S. Basketball Writers Association (USBWA) |
| Coach (X) | Denotes the number of times the coach had been awarded the Coach of the Year award at that point |
| * | Elected to the Naismith Memorial Basketball Hall of Fame as a coach but is no longer active |
| *^ | Active coach who has been elected to the Naismith Memorial Basketball Hall of Fame (as a coach) |
| Conf. W–L | Conference win–loss record for that season |
| Conf. St.^{T} | Conference standing at year's end (^{T}denotes a tie) |
| Overall W–L | Overall win–loss record for that season |
| Season^{‡} | Team won the NCAA Division I National Championship |

== Winners ==
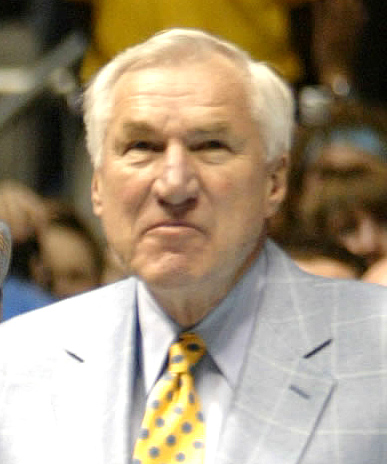
Dean Smith holds the record for most ACC Coach of the Year Awards with eight.

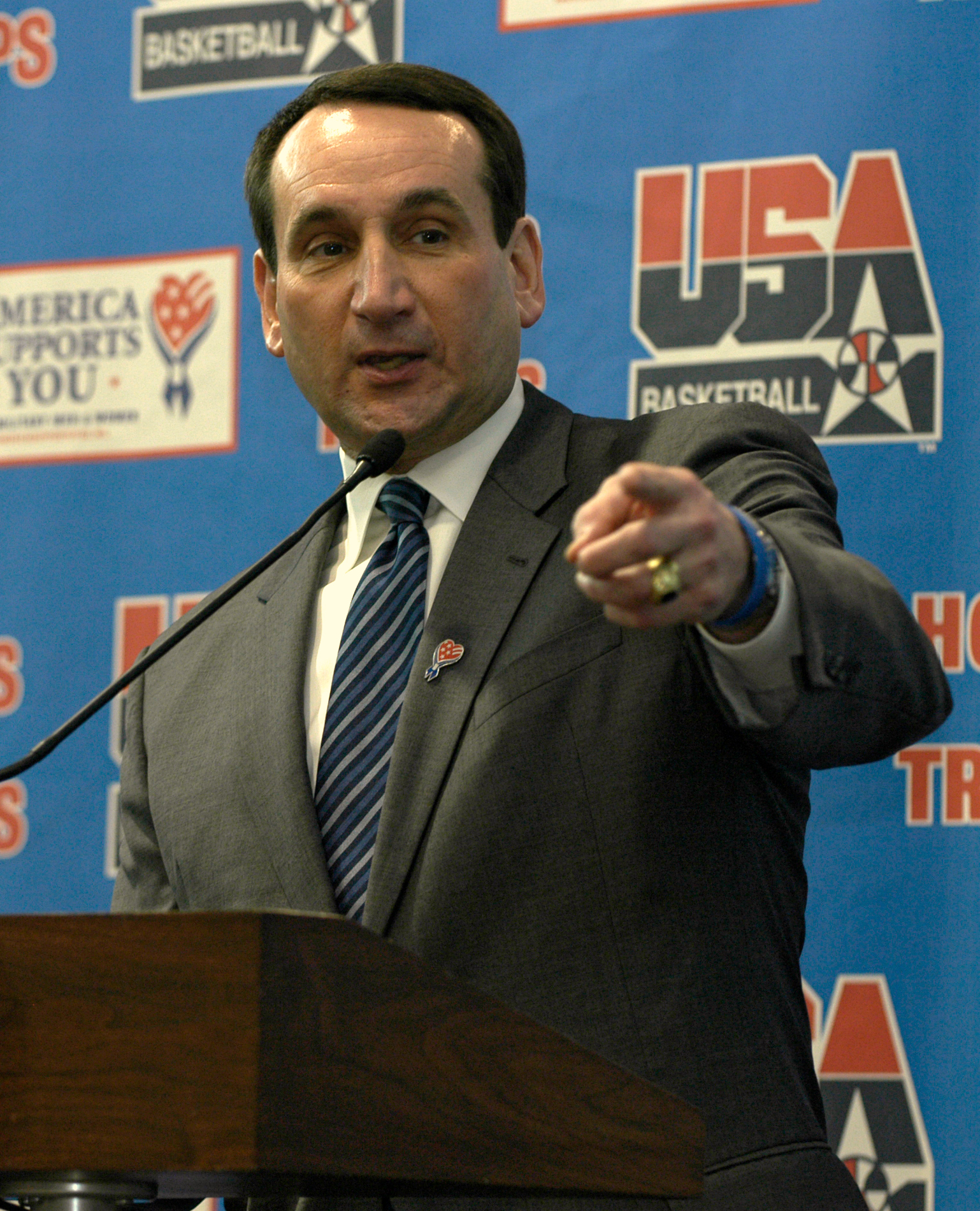
Duke head coach, Mike Krzyzewski, is second all-time in ACC Coach of the Year Awards with five.

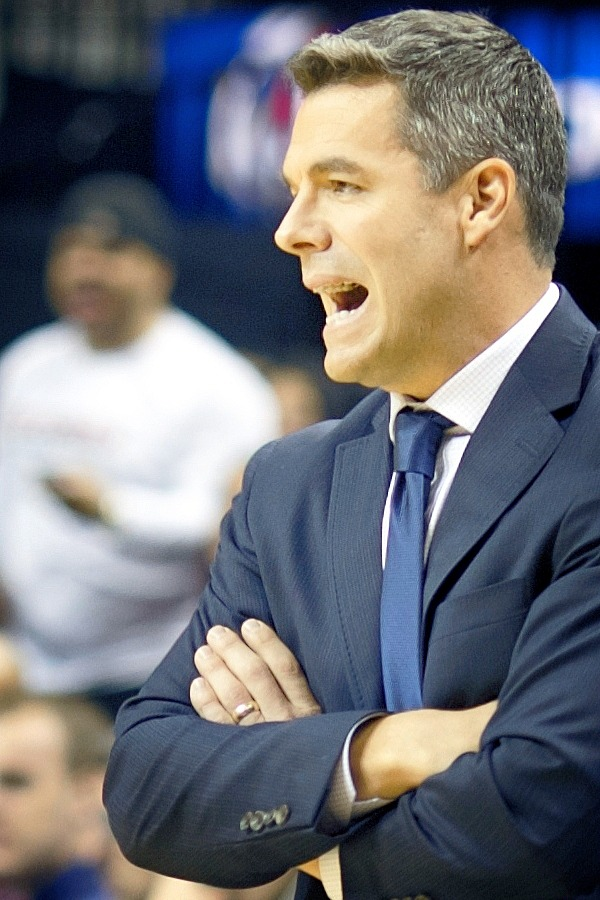
Tony Bennett of Virginia won the award four times in a six-year span.

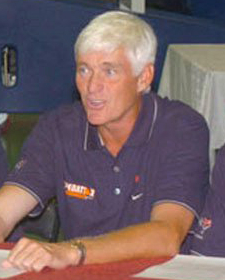
Bobby Cremins won the award three times as the head coach of Georgia Tech.

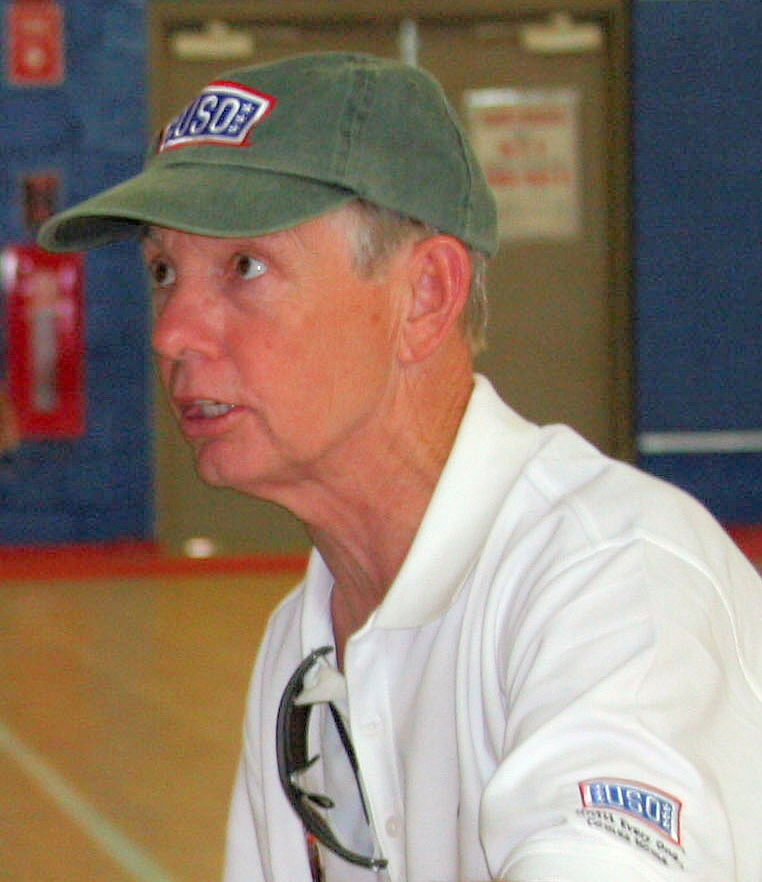
Between 1991 and 1995, Dave Odom of Wake Forest was named the Coach of the Year on three occasions.

| Season | Coach | School | National Coach of the Year Awards | Conf. W–L | Conf. St. | Overall W–L | Source(s) |
|---|---|---|---|---|---|---|---|
| 1953–54 | Everett Case* | NC State | — | 5–3 | 4 | 26–7 | |
| 1954–55 | Everett Case* (2) | NC State | — | 12–2 | 1 | 28–4 | |
| 1955–56 | Murray Greason | Wake Forest | — | 10–4 | 3^{T} | 19–9 | |
| 1956–57^{‡} | Frank McGuire* | North Carolina | UPI | 14–0 | 1 | 32–0 | |
| 1957–58 | Everett Case* (3) | NC State | — | 10–4 | 3 | 18–6 | |
| 1958–59 | Harold Bradley | Duke | — | 7–7 | 3^{T} | 13–12 | |
| 1959–60 | Bones McKinney | Wake Forest | — | 12–2 | 2^{T} | 21–7 | |
| 1960–61 | Bones McKinney (2) | Wake Forest | — | 11–3 | 2 | 19–11 | |
| 1961–62 | Bob Stevens | South Carolina | — | 7–7 | 4 | 15–12 | |
| 1962–63 | Vic Bubas | Duke | — | 14–0 | 1 | 27–3 | |
| 1963–64 | Vic Bubas (2) | Duke | — | 13–1 | 1 | 26–5 | |
| 1964–65 | Press Maravich | NC State | — | 10–4 | 2 | 21–5 | |
| 1965–66 | Vic Bubas (3) | Duke | — | 10–4 | 1 | 21–5 | |
| 1966–67 | Dean Smith* | North Carolina | — | 12–2 | 1 | 26–6 | |
| 1967–68 | Dean Smith* (2) | North Carolina | — | 12–2 | 1 | 28–4 | |
| 1968–69 | Frank McGuire* (2) | South Carolina | — | 11–3 | 2 | 21–7 | |
| 1969–70 | Norm Sloan | NC State | — | 9–5 | 3 | 23–7 | |
| 1970–71 | Dean Smith* (3) | North Carolina | — | 11–3 | 1 | 26–6 | |
| 1971–72 | Bill Gibson | Virginia | — | 8–4 | 3 | 21–7 | |
| 1972–73 | Norm Sloan (2) | NC State | — | 12–0 | 1 | 27–0^{[b]} | |
| 1973–74^{‡} | Norm Sloan (3) | NC State | AP; USBWA | 12–0 | 1 | 30–1 | |
| 1974–75 | Lefty Driesell* | Maryland | — | 10–2 | 1 | 24–5 | |
| 1975–76 | Dean Smith* (4) | North Carolina | — | 11–1 | 1 | 25–4 | |
| 1976–77 | Dean Smith* (5) | North Carolina | NABC | 9–3 | 1 | 28–5 | |
| 1977–78 | Bill Foster | Duke | NABC; SN | 8–4 | 2 | 27–7 | |
| 1978–79 | Dean Smith* (6) | North Carolina | USBWA | 9–3 | 2 | 23–6 | |
| 1979–80 | Lefty Driesell* (2) | Maryland | — | 11–3 | 1 | 24–7 | |
| 1980–81 | Terry Holland | Virginia | — | 13–1 | 1 | 29–4 | |
| 1981–82 | Terry Holland (2) | Virginia | — | 12–2 | 2 | 30–4 | |
| 1982–83 | Bobby Cremins | Georgia Tech | — | 4–10 | 6 | 13–15 | |
| 1983–84 | Mike Krzyzewski* | Duke | — | 7–7 | 3^{T} | 24–10 | |
| 1984–85 | Bobby Cremins (2) | Georgia Tech | BT | 9–5 | 1^{T} | 27–8 | |
| 1985–86 | Mike Krzyzewski* (2) | Duke | BT; CBS; UPI | 12–2 | 1 | 37–3 | |
| 1986–87 | Cliff Ellis | Clemson | — | 10–4 | 1 | 25–6 | |
| 1987–88 | Dean Smith* (7) | North Carolina | — | 11–3 | 1 | 27–7 | |
| 1988–89 | Jim Valvano | NC State | — | 9–5 | 4 | 29–8 | |
| 1989–90 | Cliff Ellis (2) | Clemson | — | 10–4 | 1 | 26–9 | |
| 1990–91 | Dave Odom | Wake Forest | — | 8–6 | 3^{T} | 19–11 | |
| 1991–92 | Pat Kennedy | Florida State | — | 11–5 | 2 | 22–10 | |
| 1992–93^{‡} | Dean Smith* (8) | North Carolina | BT; N | 14–2 | 1 | 34–4 | |
| 1993–94 | Dave Odom (2) | Wake Forest | — | 9–7 | 3 | 21–12 | |
| 1994–95 | Dave Odom (3) | Wake Forest | — | 12–4 | 1^{T} | 26–6 | |
| 1995–96 | Bobby Cremins (3) | Georgia Tech | — | 13–3 | 1 | 24–12 | |
| 1996–97 | Mike Krzyzewski* (3) | Duke | BT | 12–4 | 1 | 24–9 | |
| 1997–98 | Bill Guthridge | North Carolina | CBS; N NABC; SN | 13–3 | 2 | 34–4 | |
| 1998–99 | Mike Krzyzewski* (4) | Duke | N NABC | 16–0 | 1 | 37–2 | |
| 1999–00 | Mike Krzyzewski* (5) | Duke | — | 15–1 | 1 | 29–5 | |
| 2000–01 | Paul Hewitt | Georgia Tech | — | 8–8 | 5^{T} | 17–13 | |
| 2001–02^{‡} | Gary Williams* | Maryland | — | 15–1 | 1 | 32–4 | |
| 2002–03 | Skip Prosser | Wake Forest | — | 13–3 | 1 | 25–6 | |
| 2003–04 | Herb Sendek | NC State | — | 11–5 | 2 | 21–10 | |
| 2004–05 | Seth Greenberg | Virginia Tech | — | 8–8 | 4^{T} | 16–14 | |
| 2005–06 | Roy Williams* | North Carolina | AP; ARC; USBWA | 12–4 | 2 | 23–8 | |
| 2006–07 | Dave Leitao | Virginia | — | 11–5 | 1^{T} | 21–11 | |
| 2007–08 | Seth Greenberg (2) | Virginia Tech | — | 9–7 | 4 | 21–14 | |
| 2008–09 | Leonard Hamilton | Florida State | BT | 10–6 | 4 | 25–10 | |
| 2009–10 | Gary Williams* (2) | Maryland | — | 13–3 | 1^{T} | 24–9 | |
| 2010–11 | Roy Williams* (2) | North Carolina | — | 14–2 | 1 | 29–8 | |
| 2011–12 | Leonard Hamilton (2) | Florida State | — | 12–4 | 3 | 21–9 | |
| 2012–13 | Jim Larrañaga | Miami (FL) | AP; N USBWA | 15–3 | 1 | 29–7 | |
| 2013–14 | Tony Bennett | Virginia | — | 16–2 | 1 | 30–7 | |
| 2014–15 | Tony Bennett (2) | Virginia | USBWA | 16–2 | 1 | 30–4 | |
| 2015–16 | Jim Larrañaga (2) | Miami (FL) | — | 13–5 | 2^{T} | 25–7 | |
| 2016–17 | Josh Pastner | Georgia Tech | — | 8-10 | 11 | 21–16 | |
| 2017–18 | Tony Bennett (3) | Virginia | AP; N NABC; USBWA | 17–1 | 1 | 31–3 | |
| 2018–19^{‡} | Tony Bennett (4) | Virginia | — | 16–2 | 1^{T} | 35–3 | |
| 2019–20 | Leonard Hamilton (3) | Florida State | — | 16–4 | 1 | 26–5 | |
| 2020–21 | Mike Young | Virginia Tech | — | 9–4 | 3 | 15–5 | |
| 2021–22 | Steve Forbes | Wake Forest | — | 13–7 | 5 | 25–10 | |
| 2022–23 | Jeff Capel | Pittsburgh | — | 14–6 | 5 | 24–12 | |
| 2023–24 | Hubert Davis | North Carolina | — | 17–3 | 1 | 29–9 | |
| 2024–25 | Pat Kelsey | Louisville | — | 18–2 | 2^{T} | 27–8 | |
| 2025–26 | Jon Scheyer | Duke | NABC | 17–1 | 1 | 35–3 | |

== Winners by school ==
| School (year joined) | Winners | Years |
|---|---|---|
| North Carolina (1953) | 13 | 1957, 1967, 1968, 1971, 1976, 1977, 1979, 1988, 1993, 1998, 2006, 2011, 2024 |
| Duke (1953) | 11 | 1959, 1963, 1964, 1966, 1978, 1984, 1986, 1997, 1999, 2000, 2026 |
| NC State (1953) | 9 | 1954, 1955, 1958, 1965, 1970, 1973, 1974, 1989, 2004 |
| Virginia (1953) | 8 | 1972, 1981, 1982, 2007, 2014, 2015, 2018, 2019 |
| Wake Forest (1953) | 8 | 1956, 1960, 1961, 1991, 1994, 1995, 2003, 2022 |
| Georgia Tech (1978) | 5 | 1983, 1985, 1996, 2001, 2017 |
| Florida State (1991) | 4 | 1992, 2009, 2012, 2020 |
| Maryland (1953)^{[c]} | 4 | 1975, 1980, 2002, 2010 |
| Virginia Tech (2004) | 3 | 2005, 2008, 2021 |
| Clemson (1953) | 2 | 1987, 1990 |
| South Carolina (1953)^{[d]} | 2 | 1962, 1969 |
| Miami (FL) (2004) | 2 | 2013, 2016 |
| Louisville (2014) | 1 | 2025 |
| Pittsburgh (2013) | 1 | 2023 |
| Boston College (2005) | 0 | — |
| Notre Dame (2013) | 0 | — |
| Syracuse (2013) | 0 | — |

== See also ==
- Atlantic Coast Conference Men's Basketball Player of the Year
- List of coaches in the Naismith Memorial Basketball Hall of Fame

== Footnotes ==
- ^{a} The annotation "Miami (FL)" is used to signify that the school is the University of Miami, which is located in Coral Gables, Florida. There is another similarly–named school in the United States called Miami University, which is located in Oxford, Ohio. When these schools' athletic programs are referenced, they are usually demarcated with either "(FL)" or "(OH)" for disambiguation purposes.
- ^{b} The 1972–73 NC State Wolfpack team was forced to skip postseason play due to an NCAA recruiting infraction. Assistant coach Eddie Biedenbach had played in a pick-up (impromptu) basketball game with David Thompson on a recruiting visit to Raleigh, North Carolina. The Wolfpack finished the season undefeated at 27–0 but were never given the opportunity to compete for the national championship.
- ^{c} The University of Maryland, College Park left the ACC for the Big Ten Conference in 2014.
- ^{d} The University of South Carolina left the Atlantic Coast Conference in 1971, and is now a member of the Southeastern Conference.
