= Bill Gibson (basketball) =

American basketball coach

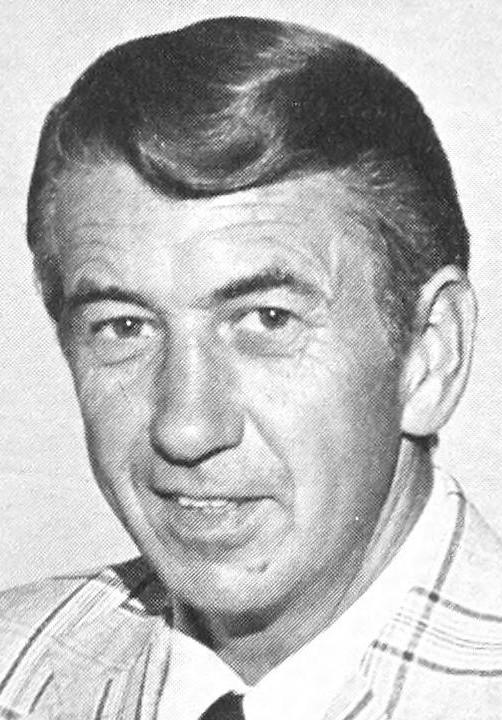
- Gibson, circa 1974

Biographical details
- Born: December 18, 1927; Donora, Pennsylvania, U.S.
- Died: July 23, 1975 (aged 47)

Coaching career (HC unless noted)
- 1956–1963: Mansfield
- 1963–1974: Virginia
- 1974–1975: South Florida

Head coaching record
- Overall: 237–205

Accomplishments and honors

Awards
- ACC Coach of the Year (1972)

William John Gibson (December 18, 1927 – July 23, 1975) was an American basketball coach who was the head men's basketball coach at the University of Virginia and the University of South Florida.

== Biography ==
Born in Donora, Pennsylvania, Gibson played basketball at Penn State University, graduating in 1952. After a four-year period of coaching high school basketball, he began his college head coaching career at Mansfield University of Pennsylvania in the 1956–57 season. In seven seasons, Mansfield posted a 102–37 win–loss record under Gibson, including a 57–3 record over the final three seasons he coached at the school. In April 1963, Virginia named him its men's basketball coach; at the time, the Cavaliers were struggling to compete in the Atlantic Coast Conference (ACC). Virginia was 8–16 in Gibson's first season as coach and did not win 10 games in a season until 1968–69.

The Cavaliers lost in the ACC tournament's first round (the tenth consecutive season Virginia had exited the tournament at that stage), and Gibson faced a "revolt" at the hands of his own players. They petitioned against Gibson, and met with Virginia's athletic director, a group of faculty, and Gibson himself. The university retained Gibson following the meetings, and the players' complaints were not mentioned in Virginia's statement to the press, though the Associated Press said they were related to "Gibson's tactics and handling of players."

The Cavaliers went 10–15 in 1969–70, but the team showed signs of improvement in its closing games. After an upset win over Duke to close the regular season, Virginia defeated North Carolina in the ACC tournament for its first win in the event in 11 years. The Cavaliers had a 15–11 record in 1970–71, and at one point achieved a top 20 national ranking. The following season, Virginia won 18 of its first 19 games, including a stretch of 12 consecutive victories, and reached a peak of sixth in the Associated Press Poll. The team tied for second in the ACC with an 8–4 record in conference play; it was the first time the Cavaliers had more wins than losses in ACC competition, and they were the first Virginia team to be in the top 20 of the Associated Press Poll at the end of the regular season. After the season, in which Virginia had an overall record of 21–7, Gibson was selected as ACC Men's Basketball Coach of the Year.

In March 1974, he accepted an offer to coach at South Florida. Four months later, he had a heart attack and was hospitalized. Gibson recovered and his South Florida team had a 15–10 record in 1974–75. On July 23, 1975, he died of what was reported as a likely second heart attack.
