= 1965–66 Utah Redskins men's basketball team =

American college basketball season

1965–66 Utah Redskins men's basketball

WAC Champions

NCAA tournament, Final Four
- Conference: Western Athletic Conference

Ranking
- Coaches: No. 12
- Record: 23–8 (7–3 WAC)
- Head coach: Jack Gardner (13th season)
- Home arena: Nielsen Fieldhouse

1965–66 WAC men's basketball standings
	Conf.				Overall
Team	W		L	PCT	W		L	PCT
Utah	7	–	3	.700	23	–	8	.742
BYU	6	–	4	.600	20	–	5	.800
Wyoming	5	–	5	.500	17	–	9	.654
Arizona	5	–	5	.500	15	–	11	.577
New Mexico	4	–	6	.400	16	–	8	.667
Arizona State	3	–	7	.300	12	–	14	.462
Rankings from AP Poll

The 1965–66 Utah Redskins men's basketball team represented the University of Utah in the 1965-66 season. Head coach Jack Gardner and senior star Jerry Chambers would lead Utah to a Western Athletic Conference championship and the Final Four of the NCAA tournament. The team finished with an overall record of 23–8 (7–3 WAC).

== Roster ==
1965–66 Utah Redskins men's basketball team
Players	Coaches
Pos. / # / Name / Height / Weight / Year / Hometown; F / 40 / Jerry Chambers / 6 ft 5 in (1.96 m) / 185 lb (84 kg) / Sr / Washington, D.C.	Head coach: Jack Gardner (USC); Assistant coach(es) Legend: (C) Team captain; (S) Suspended; (I) Ineligible; (W) Walk-on; Injured; Current redshirt

== Schedule and results ==
Date time, TV	Rank^{#}	Opponent^{#}	Result	Record	Site city, state
Regular Season
Dec 2, 1965*		Montana State	W 121–71	1–0	Nielsen Fieldhouse; Salt Lake City, Utah
Dec 4, 1965*		Loyola Marymount	W 113–81	2–0	Nielsen Fieldhouse; Salt Lake City, Utah
Dec 6, 1965*		Centenary	W 98–81	3–0	Nielsen Fieldhouse; Salt Lake City, Utah
Dec 11, 1965*		Saint Mary's	W 95–52	4–0	Nielsen Fieldhouse; Salt Lake City, Utah
Dec 16, 1965*		Morehead State	W 128–91	5–0	Nielsen Fieldhouse; Salt Lake City, Utah
Dec 18, 1965*		San Jose State	W 86–57	6–0	Nielsen Fieldhouse; Salt Lake City, Utah
Dec 23, 1965*		Air Force	W 108–57	7–0	Nielsen Fieldhouse; Salt Lake City, Utah
Dec 28, 1965*		at Cincinnati	L 66–84	7–1	Armory Fieldhouse; Cincinnati, Ohio
Dec 30, 1965*		vs. North Carolina; Triangle Doubleheader	L 85–90	7–2	Reynolds Coliseum; Raleigh, North Carolina
Dec 31, 1965*		at North Carolina State; Triangle Doubleheader	W 85–72	8–2	Reynolds Coliseum; Raleigh, North Carolina
Jan 3, 1966*		at Miami (FL)	L 87–88	8–3	Miami Beach Convention Center; Miami, Florida
Jan 7, 1966		Arizona	W 87–78	9–3 (1–0)	Nielsen Fieldhouse; Salt Lake City, Utah
Jan 8, 1966		Arizona State	W 102–83	10–3 (2–0)	Nielsen Fieldhouse; Salt Lake City, Utah
Jan 13, 1966		at Wyoming	W 93–91	11–3 (3–0)	War Memorial Fieldhouse; Laramie, Wyoming
Jan 15, 1966		at New Mexico	W 57–55	12–3 (4–0)	Johnson Gymnasium; Albuquerque, New Mexico
Jan 19, 1966*		at Hawaii	W 122–67	13–3	Neal S. Blaisdell Center; Honolulu, Hawaii
Jan 29, 1966*		at Utah State	W 94–79	14–3	Nelson Fieldhouse; Logan, Utah
Feb 4, 1966		Brigham Young	L 93–94	14–4 (4–1)	Nielsen Fieldhouse; Salt Lake City, Utah
Feb 7, 1966*		Hawaii	W 88–50	15–4	Nielsen Fieldhouse; Salt Lake City, Utah
Feb 8, 1966*		New Mexico State	W 131–94	16–4	Nielsen Fieldhouse; Salt Lake City, Utah
Feb 12, 1966*		Utah State	W 127–88	17–4	Nielsen Fieldhouse; Salt Lake City, Utah
Feb 18, 1966		at Arizona	L 68–71	17–5 (4–2)	Bear Down Gym; Tucson, Arizona
Feb 19, 1966		at Arizona State	W 92–76	18–5 (5–2)	Sun Devil Gym; Tempe, Arizona
Feb 25, 1966		Wyoming	W 107–103	19–5 (6–2)	Nielsen Fieldhouse; Salt Lake City, Utah
Feb 26, 1966		New Mexico	W 97–85	20–5 (7–2)	Nielsen Fieldhouse; Salt Lake City, Utah
Feb 28, 1966*		Seattle	W 116–103	21–5	Nielsen Fieldhouse; Salt Lake City, Utah
Mar 5, 1966		at Brigham Young	L 100–115	21–6 (7–3)	George Albert Smith Fieldhouse; Provo, Utah
NCAA Tournament
Mar 11, 1966*		vs. Pacific; Regional Final – Sweet Sixteen	W 83–74	20–6	Pauley Pavilion; Los Angeles, California
Mar 12, 1966*		vs. Oregon State; Regional Final – Elite Eight	W 70–64	21–6	Pauley Pavilion; Los Angeles, California
Mar 18, 1966*		vs. No. 3 Texas Western; National Semifinal – Final Four	L 78–85	21–7	Cole Fieldhouse (14,253); College Park, Maryland
Mar 19, 1966*		vs. No. 2 Duke; Consolation	L 77–79	21–8	Cole Fieldhouse; College Park, Maryland
*Non-conference game. ^{#}Rankings from AP Poll. (#) Tournament seedings in parentheses.

== NBA draft ==
Round	Pick	Player	NBA Club
1	7	Jerry Chambers	Los Angeles Lakers
