= Jeff Mullins (basketball) =

American basketball player and coach

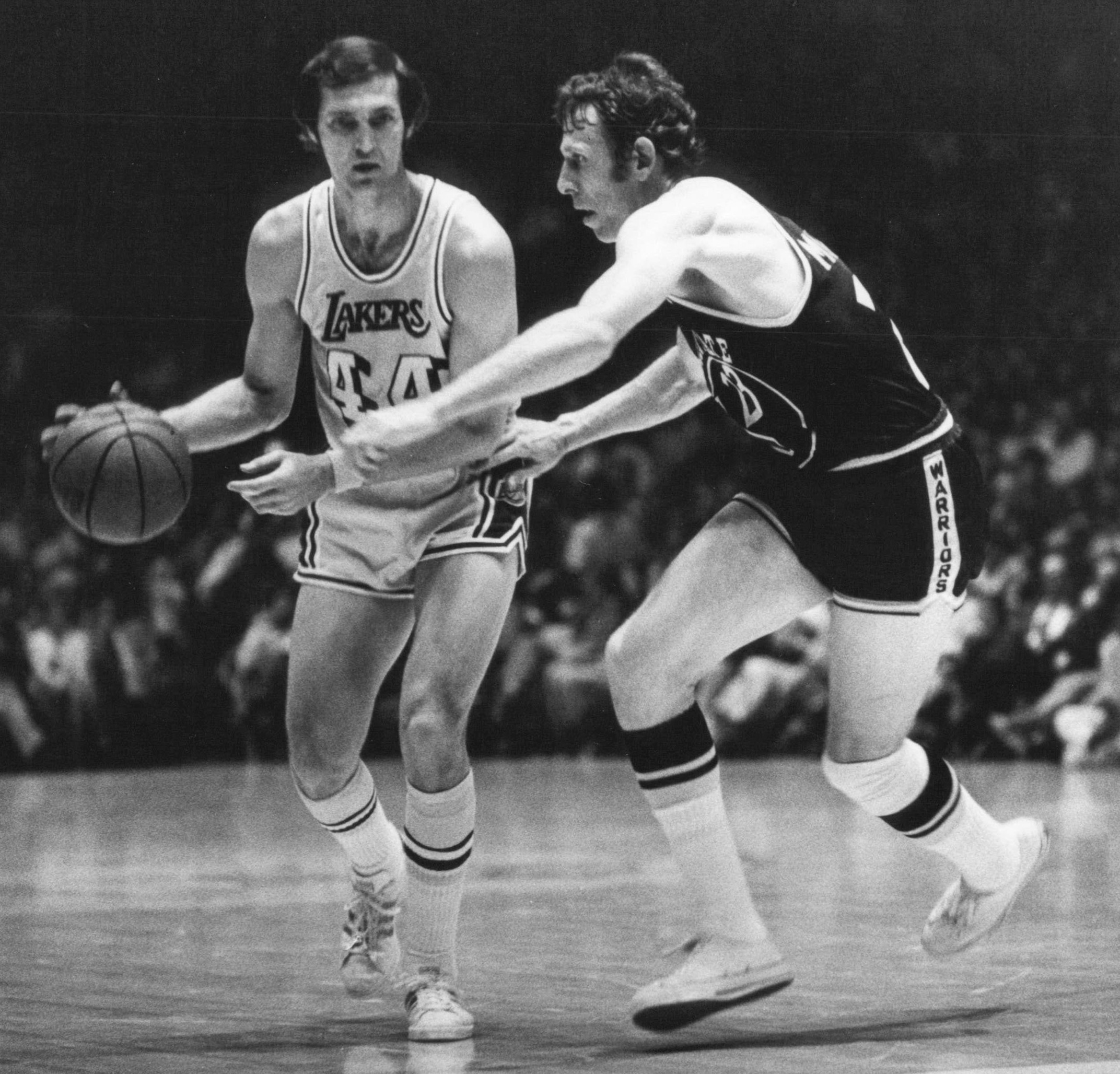
- Mullins (right) guarding Jerry West in 1971

Personal information
- Born: March 18, 1942 (age 84) Queens, New York, U.S.
- Listed height: 6 ft 4 in (1.93 m)
- Listed weight: 190 lb (86 kg)

Career information
- High school: Lafayette (Lexington, Kentucky)
- College: Duke (1961–1964)
- NBA draft: 1964: 1st round, 5th overall pick
- Drafted by: St. Louis Hawks
- Playing career: 1964–1976
- Position: Shooting guard
- Number: 44, 23
- Coaching career: 1985–1996

Career history

Playing
- 1964–1966: St. Louis Hawks
- 1966–1976: San Francisco / Golden State Warriors

Career highlights
- As player: NBA champion (1975); 3× NBA All-Star (1969–1971); Consensus second-team All-American (1964); ACC Player of the Year (1964); ACC Athlete of the Year (1964); 3× First-team All-ACC (1962–1964); No. 44 retired by Duke Blue Devils; First-team Parade All-American (1960); Kentucky Mr. Basketball (1960); As coach: Sun Belt regular season champion (1988); Sun Belt tournament champion (1988); Metro regular season champion (1995); Metro tournament champion (1992); Sun Belt Coach of the Year (1988)

Career statistics
- Points: 13,017 (16.2 ppg)
- Rebounds: 3,427 (4.3 rpg)
- Assists: 3,023 (3.8 apg)
- Stats at NBA.com
- Stats at Basketball Reference
Medals
Men's basketball
Representing the United States
Olympic Games
Gold medal – first place	1964 Tokyo	Team competition

Jeffrey Vincent Mullins (born March 18, 1942) is an American former basketball player and coach. He played college basketball with the Duke Blue Devils and in the National Basketball Association (NBA) with the St. Louis Hawks and San Francisco/Golden State Warriors. He was a three-time NBA All-Star. Mullins served as the head basketball coach at the University of North Carolina at Charlotte from 1985 to 1996, being named the Sun Belt Conference Coach of the Year in 1988, and taking his team to the NCAA Division I men's basketball tournament three times. As a college player, he was the Atlantic Coast Conference (ACC) Player of the Year and the ACC's athlete of the year (1963–64) and first-team All-ACC for three consecutive seasons (1961 to 1964). He was a consensus second-team All-American in 1964. His Duke teams twice reached the Final Four in the NCAA Division I men's basketball tournament, and he was selected to the All-Tournament Team in 1964. He scored 43 points in one NCAA tournament game.

== Early life ==
Mullins was born on March 18, 1942, in Astoria, Queens, New York. Mullins attended Lafayette High School in Lexington, Kentucky. He played on Lafayette's basketball team. He was a 6 ft 3½ in (1.92 m) or 6 ft 4 in (1.93 m) forward in high school. As a senior, in March 1960, he was named all-city in a coaches' poll. In a later poll of sportswriters and coaches he was unanimously selected to Kentucky's All-State High School Basketball Team in 1960; and was regarded as the top high school basketball player and college prospect in Kentucky that year. He was named Kentucky's Mr. Basketball. In Kentucky's East West high school all-star game, he scored 18 points and led the East team to an upset victory. He was selected to play in the 20th high-school all-star game between Kentucky and Indiana, held in June 1960.

== College and Olympic career ==
After graduation, Mullins narrowed his college choices to Duke University, the University of North Carolina and the University of Kentucky. He turned down a college scholarship from future Naismith Basketball Hall of Fame coach Adolph Rupp, the first time Rupp had ever lost out on recruiting a Lexington, Kentucky high school player he strongly wanted to play at Kentucky. Instead, Mullins chose Duke, attending from 1960 to 1964, playing under head coach Vic Bubas.

He played forward at Duke, at 6 ft 4 in. As a sophomore (1961–62) he averaged 21 points and 10.4 rebounds per game. He was named first-team All-Atlantic Coast Conference (ACC), along with teammate Art Heyman. As a junior (1962–63), he averaged 20.3 points and eight rebounds per game. He and Heyman were again named first-team All-ACC.

As a senior (1963–64), he averaged 24.2 points and 8.9 rebounds per game, and was a second team consensus All-American. Mullins was selected the ACC's Player of the Year. He was second in the ACC in scoring behind future Hall of Fame forward Billy Cunningham. Mullins was named first team All-ACC for the third consecutive year.

During his three seasons on Duke's varsity, the team went 20–5, 27–3, and 26–5. In 1961–62, Duke ended the season ranked No. 10 by the Associated Press. The following season (1962–63), Duke ended the season ranked No. 2. As a senior (1963–64), Duke ended the season ranked No. 3.

Duke won the ACC tournament in 1963. Duke defeated the University of Virginia, 89–70 in the first round. Mullins led the team with 29 points. Duke next defeated North Carolina State University, 82–65. Mullins' 25 points again led Duke in scoring. In the 1963 ACC championship game, Duke defeated Wake Forest University, 68–57, with Mullins scoring 20 points and Heyman 24. Mullins was selected to the ACC's All-Tournament first team.

Duke reached the Final Four in the 1963 NCCA men's basketball tournament, losing to eventual national champion, Loyola University of Chicago. Mullins scored 21 points in the 94–75 loss. He had led Duke with 24 points in winning the East Regional final over St. Joseph's University, and led Duke with 25 points in winning the East Regional semi-final over New York University. After losing to Loyola, Duke defeated Oregon State University to take third place in the tournament, with Mullins scoring 14 points. He was selected to the All-East Regional Team.

Duke won the ACC tournament again in 1964. Duke defeated North Carolina State in the first round, 75–44. Mullins scored 15 points in the game. Duke then beat the University of North Carolina, 65–49, with Mullins scoring 19 points. Duke again defeated Wake Forest in the ACC championship game, 80–59. Mullins led Duke with 24 points. He was selected Most Valuable Player in the ACC tournament, and was once more named to the first-team ACC All-Tournament Team.

Duke reached the championship game of the 1964 NCAA men's tournament, losing to UCLA 98–83. Mullins led all Duke players with 22 points. Duke had defeated Villanova University in the East Regional semifinals, 87–73, with Mullins leading all players with 43 points scored in the game. Duke defeated the University of Connecticut, 101–54, in the East Regional final, with Mullins scoring 30 points. Duke defeated the University of Michigan in the Final Four, 91–80, with Mullins scoring 20 points. Mullins was selected to the 1964 All-Tournament Team.

At Duke, he averaged 21.9 points and nine rebounds per game for his career. Bubas considered Mullins an inspiring leader, as well as a great player. He was class president in both his junior and senior years at Duke.

Mullins was a member of the United States Olympic basketball team that won the gold at the 1964 Summer Olympics. He played in eight games, averaging 2.3 points per game.

== Professional career ==
=== St. Louis Hawks ===
After the Los Angeles Lakers and Cincinnati Royals made territorial picks, the St. Louis Hawks took Mullins in the first round (5th pick overall) of the 1964 NBA draft. The Hawks moved Mullins from forward to guard, a difficult transition for Mullins. In two seasons with the Hawks he was a fourth guard under player-coach guard Richie Guerin, who never gained confidence in Mullins. Mullins played in 44 games as a rookie (1964–65), averaging 11.2 minutes and 4.9 points per game. The following season with the Hawks (1965–66) he suffered knee and ankle injuries, and again played 44 games, averaging 13.3 minutes and 5.8 points per game.

In the 1966 expansion draft he was selected by the Chicago Bulls. After some delay that was resolved by the NBA, in October 1966 Mullins and shooting guard Jim King were sent to the San Francisco Warriors in exchange for point guard Guy Rodgers. Rodgers had been traded earlier from the Warriors to the Bulls, who were seeking taller guards in place of the 6 ft (1.83 m) Rodgers.

=== San Francisco/Golden State Warriors ===
In the 1966–67 season, Mullins joined a Warriors team with two future Hall of Fame players: 22-year old forward Rick Barry and 25-year old center Nate Thurmond. The Warriors played under head coach Bill Sharman, later in the Hall of Fame as both a coach and a player. Mullins' playing time increased under Sharman. Mullins started his first NBA game in January 1967. Soon after, he scored over 20 points in three games over three consecutive days (January 29–31); playing over 30 minutes per game even when not starting.

Mullins played in 77 games for the Warriors in 1966–67, averaging 23.8 minutes per game. He averaged 12.9 points, five rebounds, and 2.9 assists per game, with a team-high .458 field goal percentage. The Warriors had a 44–37 record and finished first in the NBA's Western Division.

The Warriors swept the Lakers in three games to win the Western Division semifinal playoff series. Mullins averaged 13.7 points, 8.3 rebounds and 2.3 assists per game in the series. The Warriors then defeated the Hawks in six games in the Western Division finals. Mullins averaged 38.5 minutes, 23.3 points, six rebounds and 4.5 assists per game against his old team. The Warriors lost the 1967 NBA championship in six games to the Philadelphia 76ers, who featured four future Hall of Fame players on their team (Wilt Chamberlain, Billy Cunningham, Hal Greer and Chet Walker). Mullins averaged 32 minutes, 14 points, five rebounds and four assists per game in the series.

After the season, Barry, who led the NBA in scoring (35.6 points per game) and averaged nearly 41 points per game in the NBA finals, attempted to leave the Warriors to join the American Basketball Association's Oakland Oaks. A court ruled he could not do so, and rather than play for the Warriors, he sat out the 1967–68 season. That season Mullins playing time increased to 35.5 minutes per game, at shooting guard. He averaged 18.9 points, 5.7 rebounds and 4.4 assists per game; playing in 79 games. The Warriors fell to third in the Western Division (43–39), but still made the playoffs.

The Warriors faced Guerin and the Hawks in the first round of the Western Division playoffs. The Hawks were first in the Western Division with a 56–26 record. The Warriors upset the Hawks in six games. Mullins led all scorers in the series, averaging 27 points per game. He scored a game-high 29 points in the Warriors' Game 1 win (111–106), a game-high 33 points in the Warriors' 124–109 Game 3 victory, and a game-high 35 points in the Warriors' Game 4 win. Mullins hit a 15-foot bank shot with six seconds remaining to win Game 4 by one point (108–107). After winning the emotional game, Mullins' teammates carried him off the court on their shoulders. The Lakers swept the Warriors in four games in the Western Division finals. Mullins averaged 22.3 points, six rebounds and 5.8 assists per game in that series.

Over the next four seasons (1968 to 1972), Mullins averaged over 20 points per game each season and was selected to the Western Division All-Star Team three consecutive years (1968 to 1971). In 1968–69, Mullins played in 78 games, averaging 37.4 minutes, 22.8 points, 5.9 rebounds and 4.3 assists per game. He led the Warriors with a .459 field goal percentage, and in points per game. He was second in the NBA in free throw percentage (.843) and 10th in scoring average. The Warriors finished the season 41–41, and lost in the first round of the Western Division playoffs to the Lakers in six games. Mullins averaged 14.3 points and 3 rebounds per game in that series. He played 25 minutes in the 1969 All-Star game, scoring 14 points.

In 1969–70, Mullins again led the Warriors with a 22.1 points per game average, along with averaging 5.2 rebounds and 4.9 assists per game. He was third in the NBA in free throw percentage (.847) and 12th in scoring average. In 1970–71, he led the Warriors in scoring for a third consecutive season (20.8 points per game). The team finished the season 41–41, and lost in the first round of the Western Conference playoffs in five games to the eventual NBA champion Milwaukee Bucks. In that series, Mullins led the Warriors in minutes per game (41), averaging 16.4 points, 6.4 rebounds and 4.8 assists per game. He was fourth in the NBA in free throw percentage that season (.844).

In 1971–72, Mullins led the Warriors in scoring for a fourth consecutive season (21.5 points per game). He averaged a career-best 5.9 assists per game, as well as 5.6 rebounds per game. He was eighth in the NBA in assists per game. The now Golden State Warriors had a 51–31 record, finishing second in the Pacific Division. They lost to the Bucks again in five games in the first round of the Western Conference playoffs. Mullins averaged 14.8 points, 5.8 assists and 4.8 rebounds per game in the series.

After five years, Barry returned to the Warriors for the 1972–73 season. Mullins averaged 17.8 points per game that season, second on the team to Barry's 22.3 points per game. The Warriors were 47–35, once again second in the Pacific Division. They defeated the Bucks in six games in the Western Conference semifinal playoff series. Mullins' 15.3 points per game was second only to Barry (16.5 points per game) on the Warriors in that series. The Warriors lost the Western Conference finals to the Lakers in five games; Mullins averaging 14.6 points, 5.6 rebounds and 4.4 assists per game.

In the 1973–74 season, Mullins averaged 32.4 minutes, 16.2 points, 3.6 rebounds and four assists per game. The Warriors finished the season 48–34, but did not make the playoffs. Mullins' 1973–74 season averages were his lowest with the Warriors since his first year with the team. In his last two NBA seasons (1974 to 1976), Mullins suffered injuries that relegated him to reserve status. As a reserve guard in the 1974–75 season, he played in 66 games, averaging 17.3 minutes and 8.2 points per game. The Warriors won the Pacific Division with a 48–34 record, and then went on to win the NBA championship.

The Warriors defeated the Seattle SuperSonics in six games in the first round of the playoffs. Mullins averaged 16.7 minutes and 8.2 points per game in that series. In the Western Conference finals, the Warriors defeated the Chicago Bulls in seven games. Mullins averaged 19.4 minutes and 8.1 points per game in that series. In Game 2, Mullins played 35 minutes and scored 18 points in a one-point loss to the Bulls (90–89). In Game 4, the Warriors tied the series 2–2. Mullins came into the game in the second quarter and scored eight of his twelve points, in helping the team to win. The Warriors then swept the Washington Bullets in four games to win the NBA championship. Mullins averaged 19.3 minutes and eight points per game.

In his final NBA season (1975–76), Mullins hurt his knee early in the season and played little thereafter. He appeared in 29 regular season games for the Warriors, averaging less than 11 minutes and five points per game. He could have played more, but Warriors head coach and future Hall of Famer Al Attles, who had played alongside Mullins for five years as a Warriors player, and coached Mullins for seven seasons with the Warriors, did not want to embarrass Mullins by putting him into games at "garbage time". In the Western Conference playoffs, Mullins averaged less than five minutes per game. Mullins announced his retirement in October 1976. Upon his retirement in 1976, he had amassed a total of 13,017 points for a twelve-year career average of 16.2 points per game. In his ten seasons with the Warriors, he averaged 32.8 minutes, 17.5 points, 4.5 rebounds and 4.1 assists per game, totaling over 12,500 points as a Warrior.

== Coaching and athletic director career ==
After retiring in October 1976, he became an assistant athletic director at Duke University from 1976 to 1978. In 1985, Mullins was hired as the head men's basketball coach and athletic director at the University of North Carolina, Charlotte (UNC Charlotte), playing in the Sun Belt Conference (1985–1991) and later the Metropolitan Collegiate Athletic Conference (Metro Conference) (1991–1995) and Conference USA (1995–96). Mullins went on to coach the UNC Charlotte 49ers for 11 seasons (1985 to 1995). Without any impropriety on Mullins' own part, in 1989 UNC Charlotte established a rule that the head coach could not also be the athletic director, because of improprieties that had occurred at other institutions when one person held both roles. Before that, when faced with a potential conflict of interest, Mullins chose not to pursue his personal advantage over the school's interests concerning game broadcasts.

Before Mullins was hired, the basketball program had struggled since making the NCAA Final Four in 1977, and had not had a winning season since 1979–80. In three years Mullins took the 49ers back to the NCAA Tournament for the first time since their 1977 run, and he was named the 1988 Sun Belt Conference Coach of the Year. He also led the team into the NCAA tournament in 1992 and 1995. The 49ers lost in the first round each time; by six points in a 1988 overtime game to Brigham Young University, and by only two points in the 1992 (to Iowa State University, 76–74) and 1995 (to Stanford University, 70–68) tournaments.

Mullins led the 49ers to the Sun Belt regular season and tournament championships in 1988, the Metro Conference tournament championship in 1992, and the Metro Conference regular season championship in 1995. The 53-year old Mullins retired as head coach at the end of the 1995–96 season. He also led the team to two National Invitation Tournament appearances. His 182 victories over eleven seasons stood as a school record until Bobby Lutz, Mullins' former assistant coach, surpassed that total in 2008.

Before taking on the head coaching and athletic director positions at UNC Charlotte, Mullins worked as a television basketball color analyst for Atlantic Coast Conference games for seven seasons.

== Legacy and honors ==
Mullins was selected as a Parade All-American in 1960. In 1964, Mullins won the Anthony J. McKelvin award as the outstanding athlete in the Atlantic Coast Conference. In 1964, he also received the Lewis E. Teague Memorial Award as the outstanding male amateur athlete in the Carolinas (swimmer Susie Resseguie winning the female amateur athlete award). In 1978, Mullins was inducted into the Duke Athletics Hall of Fame. In 1983, he was inducted into the North Carolina Sports Hall of Fame. His no. 44 Duke jersey was retired in 1994. In 2002, Mullins was named to the ACC 50th Anniversary men's basketball team as one of the 50 greatest players in Atlantic Coast Conference history. In 2007, he was inducted into the Kentucky Athletic Hall of Fame. In 2015, he was inducted into the Kentucky High School Basketball Hall of Fame. In 2022, he was inducted into the University of North Carolina Charlotte 49ers Hall of Fame.

== Personal life ==
Many in Lexington had hard feelings against Mullins when he chose to attend Duke University instead of the University of Kentucky. When his future wife Candy Johnson's grandfather learned she intended to marry Mullins he said "Oh, you can't marry him. ... He's the guy who didn't go to UK". He lived in Cary, North Carolina when taking on the assistant athletic director position at Duke, and owned a Chevrolet dealership in Apex, North Carolina.

== Career playing statistics ==
Legend
GP	Games played	GS	Games started	MPG	Minutes per game
FG%	Field goal percentage	3P%	3-point field goal percentage	FT%	Free throw percentage
RPG	Rebounds per game	APG	Assists per game	SPG	Steals per game
BPG	Blocks per game	PPG	Points per game	**Bold**	Career high
†	Won an NBA championship	*	Led the league

=== NBA ===
==== Regular season ====
Year	Team	GP	GS	MPG	FG%	FT%	RPG	APG	SPG	BPG	PPG
1964–65	St. Louis	44		11.2	.416	.672	2.3	1.0			4.9
1965–66	St. Louis	44		13.3	.382	.806	1.6	1.5			5.8
1966–67	San Francisco	77		23.8	.458	.701	5.0	2.9			12.9
1967–68	San Francisco	79		35.5	.439	.794	5.7	4.4			18.9
1968–69	San Francisco	78		37.4	.459	.843	**5.9**	4.3			**22.8**
1969–70	San Francisco	74		38.7	.460	.847	5.2	4.9			22.1
1970–71	San Francisco	75		38.8	.482	.844	4.5	4.4			20.8
1971–72	Golden State	80		**40.2**	.467	.794	5.6	**5.9**			21.5
1972–73	Golden State	**81**		37.1	**.493**	.831	4.5	4.2			17.8
1973–74	Golden State	77		32.4	.473	**.875**	3.6	4.0	**.9**	**.3**	16.2
1974–75†	Golden State	66		17.3	.455	.816	1.9	2.3	**.9**	.2	8.2
1975–76	Golden State	29		10.7	.483	.793	1.1	1.3	.5	.0	4.8
Career		804		30.6	.463	.814	4.3	3.8	.8	.2	16.2
All-Star		3	0	14.0	.550	–	1.7	2.0			7.3

==== Playoffs ====
Year	Team	GP	MPG	FG%	FT%	RPG	APG	SPG	BPG	PPG
1965	St. Louis	2	5.5	.500	–	3.0	.5			4.0
1966	St. Louis	4	3.3	.111	.500	1.0	.0			.8
1967	San Francisco	15*	33.2	.450	.797	6.1	3.9			17.7
1968	San Francisco	10	39.0	**.521**	.721	4.4	4.9			**25.1**
1969	San Francisco	6	30.0	.406	.727	3.0	3.8			14.3
1971	San Francisco	5	**41.0**	.353	.880	**6.4**	4.8			16.4
1972	Golden State	5	40.6	.431	**.923**	4.8	**5.8**			14.8
1973	Golden State	11	37.2	.429	.724	4.2	3.9			15.0
1975†	Golden State	**17***	18.4	.488	.581	2.1	1.7	**.6**	**.1**	8.1
1976	Golden State	8	4.1	.375	–	.5	.4	.3	**.1**	1.5
Career		83	27.2	.449	.751	3.7	3.1	.5	.1	13.1

== Head coaching record ==
Record table
Season	Team	Overall	Conference	Standing	Postseason
Charlotte 49ers (Sun Belt Conference) (1985–1991)
1985–86	Charlotte	8–20	1–13	8th	
1986–87	Charlotte	18–14	6–8	T–6th	
1987–88	Charlotte	22–9	11–3	1st	NCAA Division I First Round
1988–89	Charlotte	17–12	10–4	2nd	NIT First Round
1989–90	Charlotte	16–14	6–8	5th	
1990–91	Charlotte	14–14	6–8	6th	
Charlotte 49ers (Metro Conference) (1991–1995)
1991–92	Charlotte	23–9	7–5	2nd	NCAA Division I First Round
1992–93	Charlotte	15–13	6–6	T–4th	
1993–94	Charlotte	16–13	7–5	T–2nd	NIT First Round
1994–95	Charlotte	19–9	8–4	1st	NCAA Division I First Round
Charlotte 49ers (Conference USA) (1995–1996)
1995–96	Charlotte	14–15	6–8	3rd (White)	
Charlotte:		182–142	74–72		
Total:		182–142			
National champion Postseason invitational champion Conference regular season champion Conference regular season and conference tournament champion Division regular season champion Division regular season and conference tournament champion Conference tournament champion

== See also ==
- List of All-Atlantic Coast Conference men's basketball teams
