= 1964 ACC men's basketball tournament =

- Classification: Division I
- Season: 1963–64
- Teams: 8
- Site: Reynolds Coliseum; Raleigh, North Carolina
- Champions: Duke (3rd title)
- Winning coach: Vic Bubas (3rd title)
- MVP: Jeff Mullins (Duke)

1963–64 ACC men's basketball standings
| | Conf. | | | | Overall |
| Team | W | | L | PCT | W | | L | PCT |
|---|---|---|---|---|---|---|---|---|
| No. 3 Duke † | 13 | – | 1 | .929 | 26 | – | 5 | .839 |
| Wake Forest | 9 | – | 5 | .643 | 16 | – | 11 | .593 |
| Clemson | 8 | – | 6 | .571 | 13 | – | 12 | .520 |
| South Carolina | 7 | – | 7 | .500 | 10 | – | 14 | .417 |
| North Carolina | 6 | – | 8 | .429 | 12 | – | 12 | .500 |
| Maryland | 5 | – | 9 | .357 | 9 | – | 17 | .346 |
| Virginia | 4 | – | 10 | .286 | 8 | – | 16 | .333 |
| NC State | 4 | – | 10 | .286 | 8 | – | 11 | .421 |
† 1964 ACC tournament winner Rankings from AP Poll

The 1964 Atlantic Coast Conference men's basketball tournament was held in Raleigh, North Carolina, at Reynolds Coliseum from March 5–7, 1964. Duke defeated Wake Forest, 80–59, to win their second straight championship, and third in five years. Jeff Mullins of Duke was named tournament MVP.

Duke defeated all three of their in-state rivals on their way to the tournament championship, beating NC State in the quarterfinal round, North Carolina in the semifinal, and Wake Forest in the championship game.

== Bracket ==
Quarterfinals; March 5
1 | #4 Duke | 75
8 | NC State | 44
4 | South Carolina | 63
5 | North Carolina | 80
2 | Wake Forest | 79
7 | Virginia | 60
3 | Maryland | 67
6 | Clemson | 81

Semifinals; March 6
1 | #4 Duke | 65
5 | North Carolina | 49
2 | Wake Forest | 86
6 | Clemson | 64

Championship Game; March 7
1 | #4 Duke | 80
2 | Wake Forest | 59
