= 1963–64 North Carolina Tar Heels men's basketball team =

American college basketball season

1963–64 North Carolina Tar Heels men's basketball
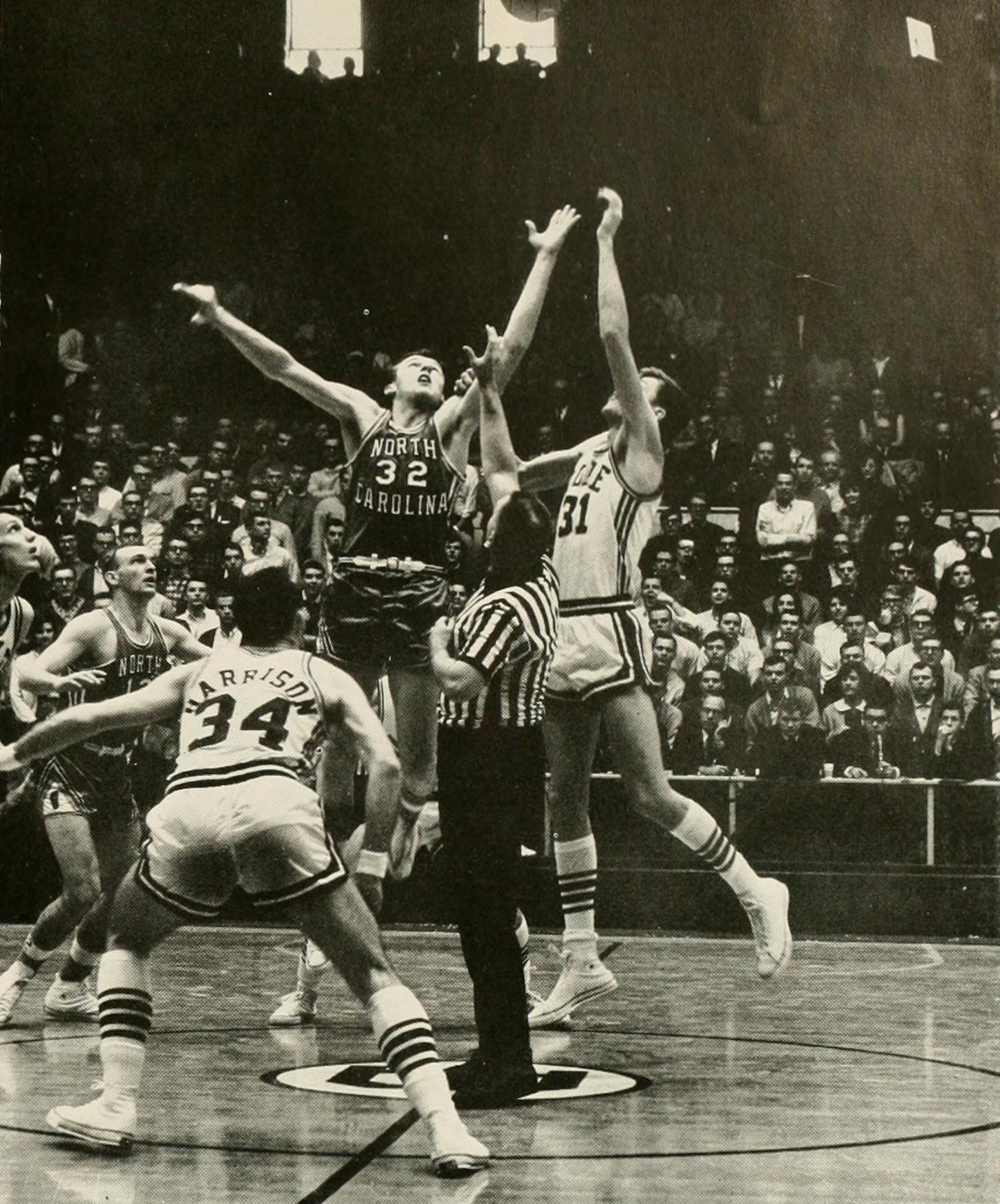
- A game in 1964
- Conference: Atlantic Coast Conference
- Record: 12–12 (6–8 ACC)
- Head coach: Dean Smith (3rd season)
- Home arena: Woollen Gymnasium

1963–64 ACC men's basketball standings
	Conf.				Overall
Team	W		L	PCT	W		L	PCT
No. 3 Duke †	13	–	1	.929	26	–	5	.839
Wake Forest	9	–	5	.643	16	–	11	.593
Clemson	8	–	6	.571	13	–	12	.520
South Carolina	7	–	7	.500	10	–	14	.417
North Carolina	6	–	8	.429	12	–	12	.500
Maryland	5	–	9	.357	9	–	17	.346
Virginia	4	–	10	.286	8	–	16	.333
NC State	4	–	10	.286	8	–	11	.421
† 1964 ACC tournament winner Rankings from AP Poll

The 1963–64 North Carolina Tar Heels men's basketball team represented the University of North Carolina at Chapel Hill during the 1963–64 men's college basketball season.

== Schedule ==
Date time, TV	Rank^{#}	Opponent^{#}	Result	Record	Site city, state
December 2		South Carolina	W 92–87		Woollen Gymnasium; Chapel Hill, NC
December 3		at Clemson	L 64–66 ^{2OT}		Clemson, SC
December 7*		vs. Indiana	W 77–70		Charlotte, NC
December 9*		at No. 9 Kentucky	L 80–100		Lexington, KY
December 14*		at LSU	W 76–71		Baton Rouge, LA
December 16*		at Tulane	W 109–81		New Orleans, LA
December 18*		Georgia	W 99–71		Woollen Gymnasium; Chapel Hill, NC
January 4*		vs. Notre Dame	W 78–68		Greensboro, NC
January 9		at Wake Forest	L 71–80		Winston-Salem, NC
January 11		at No. 9 Duke; Rivalry	L 64–84		Cameron Indoor Stadium; Durham, NC
January 13		Maryland	W 97–88		Woollen Gymnasium; Chapel Hill, NC
January 15		NC State	W 79–71		Woollen Gymnasium; Chapel Hill, NC
January 18*		Virginia Tech	L 88–90 ^{2OT}		Woollen Gymnasium; Chapel Hill, NC
February 3		Virginia	W 89–76		Woollen Gymnasium; Chapel Hill, NC
February 8		Wake Forest	W 81–73		Woollen Gymnasium; Chapel Hill, NC
February 12*		at NYU	L 68–69		New York, NY
February 14		vs. Clemson; North-South Doubleheader	L 90–97 ^{2OT}		Charlotte, NC
February 15		vs. South Carolina; North-South Doubleheader	W 84–81		Charlotte, NC
February 18		at Maryland	L 64–74		College Park, MD
February 22		at NC State	L 49–51		Raleigh, NC
February 24		at Virginia	L 64–79		Charlottesville, VA
February 29		No. 4 Duke	L 69–104		Woollen Gymnasium; Chapel Hill, NC
March 5*		vs. South Carolina; ACC tournament	W 80–63		Raleigh, NC
March 6*		vs. No. 4 Duke; ACC Tournament	L 49–65		Raleigh, NC
*Non-conference game. ^{#}Rankings from AP Poll. (#) Tournament seedings in parentheses.
