= Steve Vacendak =

American basketball player and coach

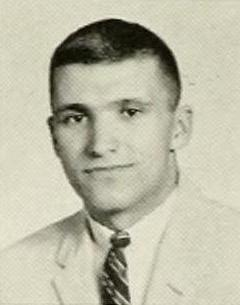
- Vacendak c. 1965

Personal information
- Born: August 15, 1944 (age 82) Scranton, Pennsylvania, U.S.
- Listed height: 6 ft 1 in (1.85 m)
- Listed weight: 185 lb (84 kg)

Career information
- High school: Scranton Prep (Scranton, Pennsylvania)
- College: Duke (1963–1966)
- NBA draft: 1966: 4th round, 33rd overall pick
- Drafted by: San Francisco Warriors
- Playing career: 1967–1970
- Position: Point guard
- Number: 22

Career history

Playing
- 1967–1969: Pittsburgh / Minnesota Pipers
- 1970: Miami Floridians

Coaching
- 1979–1980: Greensboro
- 1986–1992: Winthrop

Career highlights
- As player: ABA champion (1968); ACC Player of the Year (1966); 2× Second-team All-ACC (1965, 1966)
- Stats at Basketball Reference

Stephen T. Vacendak (born August 15, 1944) is an American former basketball player and coach. He originally came from Scranton, Pennsylvania, and was recruited by Vic Bubas to play as a guard for the Duke Blue Devils men's basketball team. As a guard for the team he led Duke to a 72–14 record and two Final Four appearances during his three-year varsity career. In 1966 he was captain of his basketball team, ACC Player of the Year, and on the All-ACC Tournament team. Despite being named player of the year, Vacendak was not named to the All-ACC team in 1966.

== Early career ==
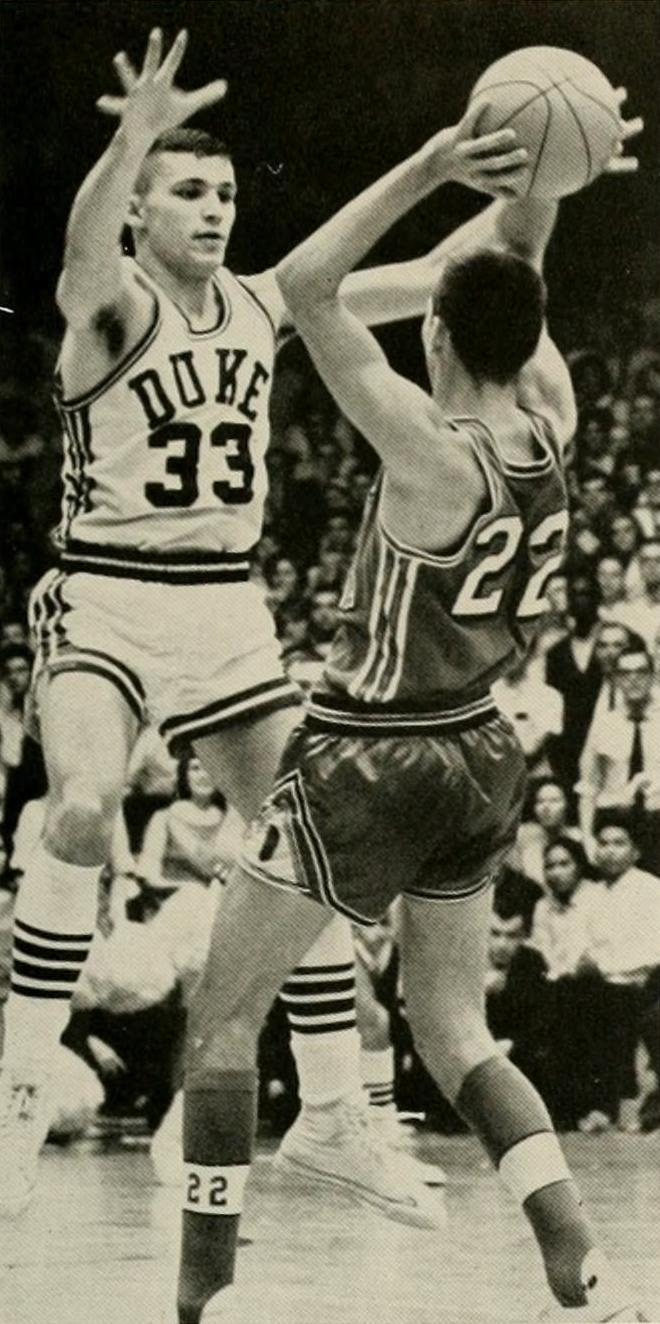
Vacendak defending against North Carolina, 1965

After graduating from Duke University, he was drafted by the San Francisco Warriors in the fourth round of the 1966 NBA draft, but he never played for them. Instead, he played professional basketball for the American Basketball Association and later joined the sales staff at Converse Rubber Company. In 1980, he went back to work at Duke as an associate athletic director for five years. Perhaps his most significant contribution to his alma mater came during this period when he strongly recommended an unknown young coach at Army – Mike Krzyzewski or Coach K – for the Duke head coaching job. Ironically, Vacendak also played a big role in recommending that NC State consider Jim Valvano for their open head coaching job and State hired Jimmy V just nine days after Duke hired Coach K. After working at Duke, he became the director of athletics and head basketball coach at Winthrop College in Rock Hill, South Carolina.

== Career ==
Following his stint at Winthrop, Vacendak spent three years working at Homeowners Clubs of America, a franchising company in Charlotte, North Carolina. He later became a partner in Damon's Restaurant in Raleigh, N.C., a position which ultimately (through a customer at Damon's) connected him with the organization with which he has been involved ever since: N.C. Beautiful.

== Other projects ==
Vacendak currently serves as the executive director for N.C. Beautiful, which is a private, non-profit organization dedicated to preserving the natural beauty of North Carolina "through environmental education and outreach." More specifically, the group provides grants to teachers to sponsor environmentally-based projects in their classrooms and helps college undergraduate and graduate students get involved in environmental research.
