= 1965–66 North Carolina Tar Heels men's basketball team =

American college basketball season

1965–66 North Carolina Tar Heels men's basketball
- Conference: Atlantic Coast Conference
- Record: 16–11 (8–6 ACC)
- Head coach: Dean Smith (5th season)
- Home arena: Carmichael Auditorium

The 1965–66 North Carolina Tar Heels men's basketball team represented the University of North Carolina at Chapel Hill during the 1965–66 men's college basketball season. This was the first season that North Carolina played its home games at Carmichael Auditorium.

== Schedule ==
1965–66 ACC men's basketball standings
	Conf.				Overall
Team	W		L	PCT	W		L	PCT
No. 2 Duke †	12	–	2	.857	26	–	4	.867
NC State	9	–	5	.643	18	–	9	.667
Clemson	8	–	6	.571	15	–	10	.600
North Carolina	8	–	6	.571	16	–	11	.593
Maryland	7	–	7	.500	14	–	11	.560
South Carolina	4	–	10	.286	11	–	13	.458
Virginia	4	–	10	.286	7	–	15	.318
Wake Forest	4	–	10	.286	8	–	18	.308
† 1966 ACC tournament winner Rankings from AP Poll

Date time, TV	Rank^{#}	Opponent^{#}	Result	Record	Site city, state
December 1		at Clemson	L 74–84		Clemson, SC
December 4*		William & Mary	W 82–68		Carmichael Auditorium; Chapel Hill, NC
December 6*		at Ohio State	W 82–72		Columbus, OH
December 8*		Richmond	W 127–76		Carmichael Auditorium; Chapel Hill, NC
December 11*		at No. 4 Vanderbilt	L 72–81		Nashville, TN
December 16*		Florida State	W 115–80		Carmichael Auditorium; Chapel Hill, NC
December 18*		vs. Florida	W 66–59		Charlotte, NC
December 27*		vs. Princeton	W 75–61		Greensboro, NC
December 30*		vs. Utah; Triangle Doubleheader	W 90–85		Raleigh, NC
December 31*		vs. West Virginia; Triangle Doubleheader	L 97–102		Raleigh, NC
January 3		Maryland	W 67–52		Carmichael Auditorium; Chapel Hill, NC
January 5		at Wake Forest	W 99–83		Winston-Salem, NC
January 8		No. 1 Duke; Rivalry	L 77–88		Carmichael Auditorium; Chapel Hill, NC
January 13		NC State	W 83–75		Carmichael Auditorium; Chapel Hill, NC
January 15		at Virginia	L 69–70		Charlottesville, VA
February 3		Wake Forest	W 115–87		Carmichael Auditorium; Chapel Hill, NC
February 5		at Maryland	L 66–77		College Park, MD
February 7		South Carolina	W 104–70		Carmichael Auditorium; Chapel Hill, NC
February 9*		at NYU	L 78–83		New York, NY
February 12*		Virginia Tech	L 75–81		Carmichael Auditorium; Chapel Hill, NC
February 15		at NC State	L 77–87		Raleigh, NC
February 18		vs. Clemson; North-South Doubleheader	W 70–66		Charlotte, NC
February 19		vs. South Carolina; North-South Doubleheader	W 83–71		Charlotte, NC
February 22		Virginia	W 81–79		Carmichael Auditorium; Chapel Hill, NC
February 26		at No. 2 Duke	L 63–77		Cameron Indoor Stadium; Durham, NC
March 3*		vs. Maryland; ACC tournament	W 77–70		Raleigh, NC
March 4*		vs. No. 2 Duke; ACC Tournament	L 20–21		Raleigh, NC
*Non-conference game. ^{#}Rankings from AP Poll. (#) Tournament seedings in parentheses.
