= 1965–66 Atlantic Coast Conference men's basketball season =

== Final standings ==
Rank	School	W	L	Win %
1	Duke	12	2	.867
2	NC State	9	5	.643
3	Clemson	8	6	.571
4	North Carolina	8	6	.571
5	Maryland	7	7	.500
6	South Carolina	4	10	.286
7	Virginia	4	10	.286
8	Wake Forest	4	10	.286

== ACC tournament ==
See 1966 ACC men's basketball tournament

== NCAA tournament ==
=== Regional semifinal ===
Duke 76, Saint Joseph's 74

=== Regional final ===
Duke 91, Syracuse 81

=== National semifinal ===
Kentucky 83, Duke 79

=== National third-place game ===
Duke 79, Utah 77

=== ACC's NCAA record ===
3-1

== NIT ==
League rules prevented ACC teams from playing in the NIT, 1954–1966
