= Vic Bubas =

American basketball player and coach (1927–2018)

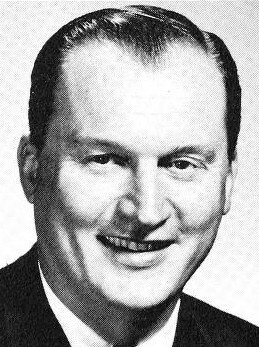
- Bubas c. 1966

Biographical details
- Born: January 28, 1927; Gary, Indiana, U.S.
- Died: April 16, 2018 (aged 91); Richmond, Virginia, U.S.

Playing career
- 1944–1945: Illinois
- 1947–1951: NC State
- Position: Guard

Coaching career (HC unless noted)
- 1951–1959: NC State (assistant)
- 1959–1969: Duke

Head coaching record
- Overall: 213–67
- Tournaments: 11–4 (NCAA University Division); 1–1 (NIT)

Accomplishments and honors

Championships
- 3 NCAA Final Four (1963, 1964, 1966); 4 ACC regular season (1963–1966); 4 ACC tournament (1960, 1963, 1964, 1966)

Awards
- 3× ACC Coach of the Year (1963, 1964, 1966); North Carolina Sports Hall of Fame (1975); Indiana Basketball Hall of Fame (2002)
- College Basketball Hall of Fame; Inducted in 2007

Victor Albert Bubas (January 28, 1927 – April 16, 2018) was an American college basketball coach for Duke University and the first commissioner of the Sun Belt Conference.

== Early life ==
Bubas graduated from Gary Lew Wallace High School in 1944. After finishing high school he enrolled at the University of Illinois, playing the 1944–45 season for the Fighting Illini. He then went on to North Carolina State University where he played for Everett Case. Bubas was an All-Southern Conference selection twice. After he graduated in 1951 he stayed on as a freshman coach until 1955 and as a varsity assistant coach until he was hired by Duke University in 1959.

== At Duke University ==
During the 1960s Bubas expanded Duke University's basketball program. He took it from a successful regional program that won a lot of games to a national program.

=== Recruiting ===
Bubas is widely credited with pioneering the art of recruiting by targeting players very early and gathering information on them before other coaches had learned of them and would send newspaper clippings of Duke games to prospects. As North Carolina legendary coach Dean Smith once stated,

"Vic taught us all how to recruit, we had been starting on prospects in the fall of their senior years while Vic was working on them their junior year. For a while, all of us were trying to catch up with him."

Bubas's tireless efforts paid off as he brought in future All-Americans from all over the country. His first big coup was getting eventual National Player Of The Year Art Heyman to go to Duke. Heyman was originally set to attend North Carolina but a near fight between Heyman's stepfather and UNC head coach Frank McGuire (McGuire took it personally when Heyman's stepfather referred to his program as "a factory") sent Heyman on a different path and Bubas stepped in and was able to convince Heyman to attend Duke.

Another big coup was getting Lexington, Kentucky native and eventual two-time All-American Jeff Mullins from the University of Kentucky and legendary Adolph Rupp. Paired together, Heyman and Mullins formed a devastating duo, reaching the Final Four in 1963 and 1964.

In 1965 Bubas recruited Claudius Claiborne, the first black athlete to play a varsity sport at Duke University.

=== Performance ===
At the time, freshmen were not allowed to play on the varsity and only the winner of the ACC Tournament could go to the NCAA Tournament. Vic Bubas' Duke teams still flourished. What began during that 1959–60 season grew rapidly over the course of the decade. In that first season, Duke was blown out twice each by Wake Forest and North Carolina. But in the ACC Tournament, Bubas got revenge, stunning 16th-ranked North Carolina and 18th-ranked Wake Forest in the title game for Duke's first ACC championship. Duke received the automatic bid in the NCAA tournament, where the Blue Devils won two games before losing to 12th-ranked NYU. It was a very surprising first season for the young coach. As his program progressed, Duke would finish in the AP Top-10 basketball poll in seven of his ten seasons. He led Duke to the NCAA Final Four three times (1963, 64 and 66). His teams finished first in league play on four occasions and won four ACC championships, competing in the ACC Tournament championship game in eight of his ten seasons. Bubas led Duke to a 213–67 record, which was the 3rd-highest win total in America during the Sixties. His .761 winning percentage ranks tenth all-time among NCAA coaches.

== Retirement and death ==
Bubas retired from coaching in 1969 and then served as a Duke administrator, eventually becoming the vice president of the university. In 1976, he became the first commissioner of the Sun Belt Conference, a position he held for fourteen years until his retirement. The Sun Belt's all-sports championship trophy, the Vic Bubas Cup, is named after him.

In 2007 Bubas was inducted into the National Collegiate Basketball Hall of Fame.

Bubas died on the morning of April 16, 2018 at age 91.

== Head coaching record ==
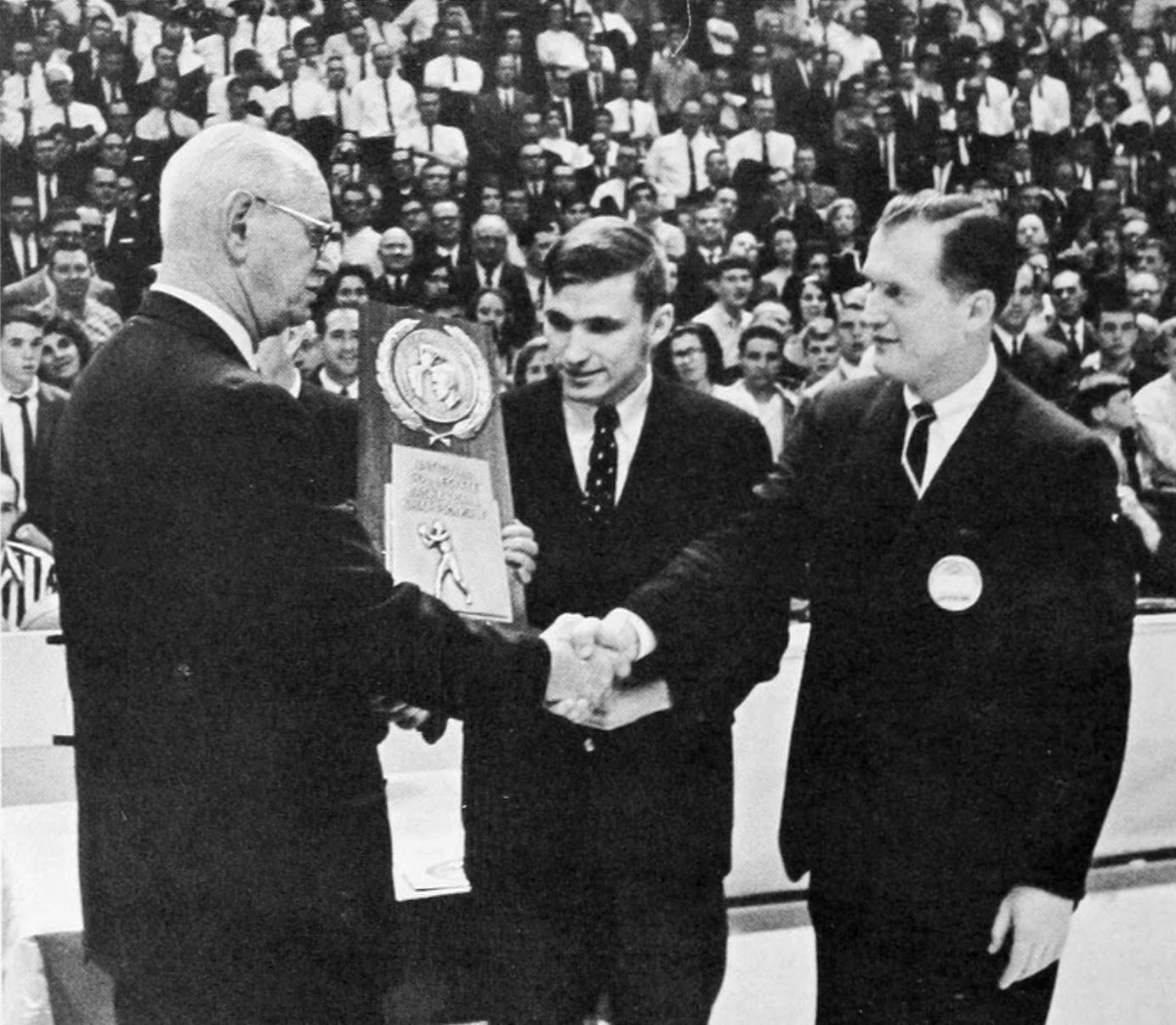
Coach Bubas (right) and captain Steve Vacendak accepting the NCAA third-place trophy in 1966

Record table
Season	Team	Overall	Conference	Standing	Postseason
Duke Blue Devils (Atlantic Coast Conference) (1959–1969)
1959–60	Duke	17–11	7–7	4th	NCAA University Division Elite Eight
1960–61	Duke	22–6	10–4	3rd	
1961–62	Duke	20–5	11–3	2nd	
1962–63	Duke	27–3	14–0	1st	NCAA University Division Final Four
1963–64	Duke	26–5	13–1	1st	NCAA University Division Runner-up
1964–65	Duke	20–5	11–3	1st	
1965–66	Duke	26–4	12–2	1st	NCAA University Division Final Four
1966–67	Duke	18–9	9–3	2nd	
1967–68	Duke	22–6	11–3	2nd	NIT quarterfinal
1968–69	Duke	15–13	8–6	T–3rd	
Duke:		213–67	106–32		
Total:		213–67			
National champion Postseason invitational champion Conference regular season champion Conference regular season and conference tournament champion Division regular season champion Division regular season and conference tournament champion Conference tournament champion

== See also ==
- List of NCAA Division I Men's Final Four appearances by coach
