= 1963–64 Atlantic Coast Conference men's basketball season =

== Final standings ==
Team	ACC Regular Season	ACC %	All Games	All Games %	Nonconference Games	Nonconference Games %	Ranked AP All	Ranked AP All %	Ranked AP Nonconference	Ranked AP Nonconference %
Duke	13–1	.929	26–5	.839						
Wake Forest	9–5	.643	16–11	.593						
Clemson	8–6	.571	13–12	.520						
South Carolina	7–7	.500	10–14	.417						
North Carolina	6–8	.429	12–12	.500						
Maryland	5–9	.357	9–17	.346						
NC State	4–10	.286	8–11	.421						
Virginia	4–10	.286	8–16	.333						
Total			102–98	.510						

== ACC tournament ==
See 1964 ACC men's basketball tournament

== NCAA tournament ==
=== Regional semi-finals ===
Duke 87, Villanova 73

=== Regional finals ===
Duke 101, Connecticut 54

=== National semi-finals ===
Duke 91, Michigan 80

=== National championship ===
UCLA 98, Duke 83

=== ACC's NCAA record ===
3–1

== NIT ==
League rules prevented ACC teams from playing in the NIT, 1954–1966
