= Gus Johnson (basketball) =

American basketball player (1938–1987)

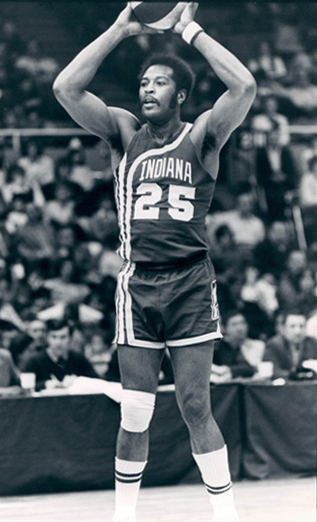
- Johnson with the Indiana Pacers during the 1972–73 ABA season

Personal information
- Born: December 13, 1938 Akron, Ohio, U.S.
- Died: April 29, 1987 (aged 48) Akron, Ohio, U.S.
- Listed height: 6 ft 6 in (1.98 m)
- Listed weight: 230 lb (104 kg)

Career information
- High school: Central (Akron, Ohio)
- College: Boise State (1961–1962); Idaho (1962–1963)
- NBA draft: 1963: 2nd round, 10th overall pick
- Drafted by: Chicago Zephyrs
- Playing career: 1963–1973
- Position: Power forward / small forward
- Number: 25, 13

Career history
- 1963–1972: Baltimore Bullets
- 1972: Phoenix Suns
- 1972–1973: Indiana Pacers

Career highlights
- ABA champion (1973); 5× NBA All-Star (1965, 1968–1971); 4× All-NBA Second Team (1965, 1966, 1970, 1971); 2× NBA All-Defensive First Team (1970, 1971); NBA All-Rookie First Team (1964); No. 25 retired by Washington Wizards; No. 43 retired by Idaho Vandals

Career NBA and ABA statistics
- Points: 10,243 (16.2 ppg)
- Rebounds: 7,624 (12.1 rpg)
- Assists: 1,603 (2.5 apg)
- Stats at NBA.com
- Stats at Basketball Reference
- Basketball Hall of Fame

Gus "Honeycomb" Johnson Jr. (December 13, 1938 – April 29, 1987) was an American professional basketball player who played in the National Basketball Association (NBA) and the American Basketball Association (ABA). Often playing as a power forward, Johnson spent nine seasons with the Baltimore Bullets before he split his final campaign between the Phoenix Suns and Indiana Pacers.

In his hometown of Akron, Johnson won a city championship for Central-Hower High School and was at one point called the best player to come out of the city. Not intending to go to college, he played in the Amateur Athletic Union and industrial leagues before being recruited to play at Boise Junior College in 1961 at the age of 23. He transferred to the University of Idaho in 1962, where he averaged 19 points and 20 rebounds per game in his only season. He was selected in the second round as the 11th pick for the 1963 NBA draft by the Chicago Zephyrs (who relocated to become the Baltimore Bullets prior to the start of the 1963–64 season). He averaged 17 points with 13 rebounds to finish second in Rookie of the Year voting while being named to the All-Rookie Team. He quickly became known as a lethal inside scorer (including shattering three backboards in his NBA career) and a key defender, which saw him named to the NBA All-Star Game five times with four selections to the All-NBA Second Team and two All-Defensive First Team.

Knee injuries started to take their toll on him by 1970. He tried to play through injuries as the Bullets reached the NBA Finals in 1971 and lost in a sweep. After undergoing surgery on both knees, he was traded in June 1972 to the Phoenix Suns, playing 21 games before being released. He was picked up by the Indiana Pacers in December 1972 as a veteran presence and averaged six points in 50 games as the team advanced all the way to the ABA Finals. In his final game in Game 7, he played 13 minutes and grabbed six rebounds as the Pacers won the game, delivering Johnson's only championship. His number 25 jersey was retired by the Bullets franchise in 1986, months before his death.

Johnson would be posthumously inducted into the Naismith Memorial Basketball Hall of Fame in 2010.

== Early life ==
Johnson was born on December 13, 1938, in Akron, Ohio as one of six children with a modest upbringing that saw him frequent local bars and pool halls as a teenager.

Johnson attended Akron Central High School, where he starred on the basketball team under coach Joe Siegferth. The two worked well together due to Johnson's drive as a player—in contrast to his indifference in the classroom (at one point, he was suspended for fighting). In a 1964 Sports Illustrated interview, Johnson stated,

"Despite my ways, I never got into any real bad trouble in Akron. ... I just drifted around. Nothing mattered except basketball and the Bible. I used to read the Bible all the time. I still do. I'm real big on Samson. He's helped me a lot, I suppose. He stimulates me."

With a 6 ft 6 in (1.98 m) frame in high school, Johnson quickly excelled in the sport. In 1958, Johnson led the team to a city championship. He was selected an All-City and All-District basketball player as well as an All-State basketball player for the 1957–58 season. He once scored 65 points in a single game.

One of his high school teammates was fellow future Naismith Memorial Basketball Hall of Fame member Nate Thurmond, who was one year behind Johnson in high school.

Johnson was sought by many colleges, although he did not express much interest in them. In 1960, the Cleveland Plain Dealer called Johnson "the greatest high school player to come out of Akron."

=== Rivalry with Jerry Lucas ===
Johnson played Ohio high school basketball contemporaneously with fellow future Naismith Hall of Fame forward/center Jerry Lucas, who played at Middletown High School. In 1958, Lucas was named to the International News Service Class AA All-Ohio team for the third time, while Johnson was only an honorable mention. Lucas went on to an All-American college career at Ohio State, with his team winning the 1960 NCAA championship; he played with the legendary 1960 U.S. Men's Olympic Basketball Team; and had a Hall of Fame NBA career. Naismith Hall of Fame member Wayne Embry said Johnson felt a rivalry with Lucas because Johnson was considered the second-best player in Ohio high school basketball to Lucas, but Johnson believed he was at least Lucas's equal.

For Johnson, the high school rivalry carried into their future NBA careers, where the unknown Johnson believed he was just as good as the highly publicized Lucas. Embry, a teammate with Lucas during his time with the Cincinnati Royals, stated that he saw Johnson play with extra ferocity whenever he faced Lucas. Johnson himself said during his and Lucas's NBA rookie season (1963–64), "I get all psyched up when I know I'm going to play against Lucas. He's the only one I worry about. ... And when he scores a basket, I burn up inside". Lucas talked in more measured language about playing against Johnson.

Basketball executive Jerry Krause, who was with the Baltimore Bullets when Johnson played for them, said Johnson would motivate himself in games against Lucas by staring at pictures of Lucas in the locker room before their games. Krause thought that Johnson's anger toward Lucas was rooted in their Ohio high school basketball days, with Johnson believing Lucas received so much more publicity because he was a white superstar.

== National Industrial League and college career ==
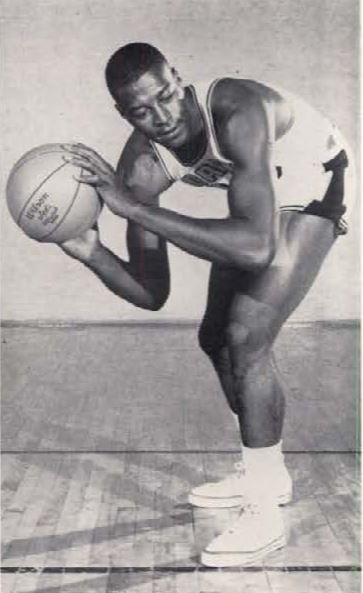
Johnson during his single season at Idaho

After graduating from high school, Johnson did not intend to go to college and ignored recruitment letters. He played on local independent teams and barnstormed in tournaments throughout Ohio. Among those teams, he played industrial league basketball for the Goodyear Wingfoots of the National Industrial Basketball League. Johnson eventually enrolled at University of Akron and was expected to be the school's starting center for the 1959–60 season; however, Johnson was ruled out as academically ineligible and left the school, never playing for them.

Johnson joined a nearby Amateur Athletic Union club, the Cleveland Sweeny Pipers, in early 1960. In April 1960, he played for Ravenna Duracote in the Little City Basketball Tournament, leading them to a tournament victory and making the All-Tournament team. In 1961, he played for the Carney Auditors in the Plain Dealer Greater Cleveland Basketball League, and subsequently for Tramonte Distributing of Akron, where one of his teammates was George Swyers.

Swyers, a former AAU teammate and friend of the first-year University of Idaho head coach Joe Cipriano, told Cipriano of Johnson. Swyers and Cipriano wanted Johnson to attend Boise Junior College and then join Cipriano at Idaho after a year. Johnson had known Swyers since Johnson was in tenth grade, and Swyers had been helpful in Johnson's career. Johnson did attend Boise for one year, averaging 30 points and 20 rebounds a game for the Broncos, including a 55-point game. It has also been reported he averaged 27.1 points per game or even 28.2 points per game, scoring over 30 points in a game 13 times, and setting a then-school record of 43 points in a single game. Boise's game attendance went from 40 fans to over 900 fans. He was also the school's first black athlete.

Cipriano offered the 23-year-old sophomore Johnson an athletic scholarship, and Johnson transferred north to the University of Idaho in Moscow in 1962. Cipriano became a father figure to him, and Johnson had few problems in Idaho. The Vandals had a .500 season at 13–13 the previous season, and the addition of Johnson made an immediate impact as they won their first five games and were 12–2 through January. Idaho was undefeated in January with Johnson playing. Due to NCAA rules at the time for a junior college transfer originally enrolled at a four-year school, he was only allowed to play regular-season games, not tournaments. The Vandals went 1–2 without him at the Far West Classic in late December in Portland, and the victory was a one-pointer over WSU. A week earlier with Johnson, the Vandals routed the Cougars by 37 points in Moscow.

Johnson became known as "Honeycomb," a nickname Cipriano gave him because of his sweet play. As a junior, he averaged 19.0 points and 20.3 rebounds per game during the 1962–63 season, leading independent Idaho to a 20–6 record, their best in 36 years. With Johnson and leading scorer Chuck White, the Vandals were at their best in their main rivalries, 4–0 versus Oregon, 4–1 versus Palouse neighbor Washington State, and 1–1 against Washington. Idaho's primary nemesis was Seattle University, led by guard Eddie Miles, who won all three of its games with the Vandals. Idaho lost its only game with Final Four-bound Oregon State at the Far West without Johnson, but still won all three with Gonzaga, for a 9–3 record against its four former PCC foes and a collective 12–6 against the six Northwest rivals. Attendance at the Memorial Gym was consistently over-capacity, with an estimated 3,800 for home games in the cramped facility.

Johnson and center Paul Silas of Creighton fought a season-long battle for the NCAA rebounds lead. Silas claimed the title by a scant 0.3 rebounds with an average of 20.6 per game. Johnson also set the UI record with 31 rebounds in a game against Oregon. Ducks head coach Steve Belko, a former Vandal, called Johnson a "6' 6" Bill Russell" and "the best ball player one of my teams has ever played against ..."

Despite their 20–6 (.769) record, the Vandals did not claim a post-season berth. The 1963 NCAA tournament included only 25 teams, and Oregon State and Seattle were selected from the Northwest. The 1963 NIT invited only twelve teams, none from the Mountain or Pacific time zones. If the Vandals had been invited, Johnson again would not have been eligible to participate.

During his time at Idaho, Johnson's standing high jump ability led the Corner Club, a local sports bar, to establish "The Nail" challenge. Anyone who could match Johnson's leap from a standing start to touch a nail hammered 11 ft 6 in (3.51 m) above the ground would win free drinks. It only happened 23 years later when high jumper Joey Johnson, brother of basketball Hall of Fame guard Dennis Johnson, touched the nail. Both Gus Johnson and Dennis Johnson were posthumously inducted into the Hall of Fame in 2010.

Johnson turned professional after his only season at Idaho, and Cipriano moved on to coach at Nebraska. Without Johnson (and White), the Vandals fell to 7–19 in 1963–64 and were 4–6 in the new Big Sky Conference, fifth place in the six-team league. They had a dismal 3–14 record through January and lost every game against their Northwest rivals, a collective 0–10 vs UW, WSU, UO, OSU, Seattle U., and Gonzaga. Johnson had another year of eligibility at Idaho, but decided to go the NBA, and later regretted not getting his degree.

Following his professional career, Johnson returned to Moscow to help commemorate the first basketball game in the newly enclosed Kibbie Dome, held on January 21, 1976. He participated in a pre-game alumni contest between former players of Idaho and Washington State.

== Professional career ==
=== Baltimore Bullets ===
==== 1963–67 ====
Johnson got a late start as an NBA player, as he turned age 25 in December of his rookie season. He was selected 11th overall (second round) of the 1963 NBA draft by the Chicago Zephyrs, who were in the process of moving to Baltimore, where they became known as the Bullets for the 1963–64 season. Johnson was an immediate starter under head coach Bob "Slick" Leonard and averaged 17.3 points and 13.6 rebounds per game that season. Leonard later said about a young Johnson, "I could see Gussie developing into one of the great defensive forwards of all time."

Playing with Baltimore under Leonard, the young starting five, consisting of center Walt Bellamy (the first overall draft pick in 1961 and the 1962 Rookie of the Year for the Chicago Zephyrs), forwards Terry Dischinger (a member of the 1962–63 all-rookie team as a Chicago Zephyr) and Johnson, and guards Rod Thorn and Kevin Loughery were nicknamed the "Kiddie Corps." Johnson finished as the runner-up for Rookie of the Year honors, behind his rival Jerry Lucas, with Nate Thurmond placing as third in the voting. Lucas had averaged 17.7 points and 17.4 rebounds per game for the Cincinnati Royals and started for the East in the 1964 NBA All-Star Game in January. Johnson was selected to the NBA All-Rookie Team along with Lucas, Thurmond, teammate Rod Thorn and Art Heyman.

From the start, Johnson was both a lethal inside scorer and an exciting open-court player, and his presence improved the team. In 1962–63, playing as the Chicago Zephyrs, the team had finished 25–55, fifth in the Western Division. The following season, when Johnson joined the now-renamed Baltimore Bullets, the team improved to a 31–49 record, and were fourth in the Western Division. In 1964–65, the Bullets improved to 37–43 and reached third place in the Western Division, making the playoffs. The Bullets defeated the St. Louis Hawks in the first round of the playoffs, before losing to the Los Angeles Lakers in the Western Division Finals, four games to two. Johnson averaged approximately 16 points and 11 rebounds per game against both the Hawks and Lakers in the playoffs. Johnson was selected to play in the All-Star game for the first time and scored 25 points in 25 minutes in the 1965 NBA All-Star Game.

In the 1965–66 season, the Bullets rose to second place in the Western Division at 38–42. Johnson missed considerable time in the 1965–66 season with a navicular bone displacement injury early in the season, and torn ligaments in his right leg in an early March game, suffered while rebounding, that ended his regular season. Johnson played in only 41 games that season. The Bullets were swept in the first round of the playoffs. Johnson attempted to play in Game 3, the elimination game in the series, but lasted only eight minutes, after his injury-riddled season.

In 1966–67, the Bullets regressed to 20–61, though Johnson averaged a double-double in 73 games and was 10th in the NBA in scoring average and 12th in rebounding average. From the 1964–65 season to the 1966–67 season, Johnson averaged 18.6, 16.5 and 20.7 points per game and 13, 13.3 and 11.7 rebounds per game, respectively. He was selected second-team All-NBA in both 1964–65 and 1965–66.

=== 1967–72 ===
With the first and second-round draft choices every year, the Bullets had gradually grown to be a better team, by adding a number of players who all made the NBA All-Rookie Team: Johnson (1963–1964), Rod Thorn (1963–1964), Wali Jones (1964–1965), and Jack Marin (1966–1967). The team's trajectory changed more dramatically during Johnson's final seasons with the Bullets when he was joined by All-Rookie Team members Earl Monroe (1967–68) and Wes Unseld (1968–69). Monroe was the near unanimous selection for Rookie of the Year in the 1967–68 season. Unseld was both the Rookie of the Year and the NBA Most Valuable Player in 1968–69, and became the keystone of the Bullets team that won the NBA Eastern Division for their very first time that season. Unseld would go on to the playoffs with the Bullets for the next 11 years (winning a championship in 1977–78).

Johnson had four consecutive All-Star seasons with the Bullets from 1967 to 1971, including the Bullets' watershed basketball season of 1968–69. In 1967–68, he averaged 19.1 points and 13 rebounds per game in 60 games. He was an All-Star in 1968–69, averaging 17.9 points and 11.6 rebounds, but missed over 30 games after undergoing knee surgery in early February. He was an All-Star again in 1969–70, averaging 17.3 points and 13.9 rebounds per game, and was selected second-team All-NBA. Johnson was first-team NBA All-Defensive Team in 1969–70, the second year the award was given.

In early 1970, the Bullets and Cincinnati Royals had agreed to trade Johnson for future Hall of Fame guard Oscar Robertson; but Robertson had a no-trade clause in his contract and rejected the deal. Johnson had mixed feelings about how the Bullets handled the situation, and the conditions he would expect in the future if he were traded. But he was almost ecstatic about the fact that he could be considered worthy of a trade for Robertson, whom he considered "the best all around basketball player the world has ever known" and was incredulous at the idea that anyone would consider trading Oscar Robertson at all.

In 1970–71, he was named to the All-Star game for the fourth consecutive season, averaging 18.2 points and 17.1 rebounds per game. Johnson was second-team All-NBA again in 1970–71. He received another first-team NBA All-Defensive Team selection in 1970–71. Johnson was 10th in MVP voting in 1970–71. This was his last productive season, however, as his physical decline rapidly accelerated toward the end of the season.

==== Injuries and playoffs ====
Johnson's career was marked by the failing health of his knees during this later time period. In 1968–69, although an All-Star, he played in only 49 games after having left knee surgery in February 1969, missing the rest of the season. Without Johnson, the Bullets were swept in the first round of the playoffs by the New York Knicks. With Johnson playing in the 1969–70 season playoff rematch with the Knicks, the Bullets took the eventual NBA champion Knicks to seven games, before losing the series. Johnson played in all seven games, averaging 18.4 points and 11.4 rebounds per game in the series.

By early 1970, Johnson candidly recognized the toll injuries had taken on his body over his seven-year career, and that each injury "takes something away from me" physically and in his skills. He had even considered retiring after his 1969 knee injury. He was taking pain-killing injections just to play after a muscle injury in 1970, until the doctors told him he had to rest. Johnson became more cautious about using his acrobatic style of play. He only saw himself playing for three more years, until he had accumulated 10 years in the league.

His left knee continued to degenerate, however, and by 1971 he had to take xylocaine shots to be able to bend the knee; developing a fear he would become permanently disabled if he kept playing under those conditions. At the same time, he also began experiencing problems with his right knee. He played in 66 games during the 1970–71 season. During the 1971 playoffs, he played through pain in his damaged and degenerative knees to compete in all seven games of the Eastern Division semifinal playoffs against the Philadelphia 76ers, averaging 14.9 points and 12.3 rebounds per game; but he was derailed by his bad knees in the final two rounds of the playoffs in 1971.

Johnson was only able to play in two games of a seven-game 1971 Eastern Conference finals against the New York Knicks. The Bullets were down three games to two in that series. Johnson chose to take the painkilling knee injections and play in Games 6 and 7 (the two games being played over a 36-hour period) to try and stop the Knicks from winning their third straight playoff series over the Bullets. The Bullets won Game 6 by a substantial margin in Baltimore. Johnson played 19 minutes, with 10 points and four rebounds. Back in New York for Game 7, he played 24 minutes with eight points and nine rebounds. Johnson grabbed the final rebound of the game after Unseld blocked Bill Bradley's shot from the corner, securing the Bullets' Game 7 victory, 93–91.

After that series ended, however, he could only play for 57 total minutes in two of the four-game 1971 NBA finals. The Bullets were swept 4–0 by the Milwaukee Bucks, led by future Naismith Hall of Fame members Kareem Abdul-Jabbar, Oscar Robertson and Bobby Dandridge. Overall Johnson averaged 13 points and 10.4 rebounds per playoff game that season.

By 1971–72, Johnson had undergone surgery on both knees, and he could no longer perform as he once had. He played in only 39 games, averaging just 6.4 points and 5.8 rebounds in a little over 17 minutes per game. That season would be his last with the Bullets. He was the last member of the 1963–64 Bullets remaining with the team. Within a few months of the season's end, the Bullets traded Jack Marin for future Hall of Fame center/forward Elvin Hayes. In nine seasons with Baltimore, Johnson averaged 17.5 points, 12.9 rebounds, 2.9 assists and 35.2 minutes in 560 games.

=== Phoenix Suns (1972) ===
Johnson was traded to the Phoenix Suns on April 12, 1972, completing a transaction from two days prior when the Bullets acquired a second-round pick (25th overall) in the 1972 NBA draft and selected Tom Patterson. Johnson played 21 games before being waived on December 1. He averaged 7.8 points and 6.5 rebounds in 19.9 minutes under head coaches Butch van Breda Kolff (fired after seven games) and Jerry Colangelo, Johnson's former Bullets teammate.

=== Indiana Pacers (1972–73) ===
The Indiana Pacers, then of the American Basketball Association (ABA), picked up Johnson in mid-December 1972, after he was recruited to the Pacers by his original Bullets coach, Hall of Fame inductee Slick Leonard. "It doesn't hurt to have some veterans around, and Gus was great for team chemistry," Leonard said of adding Johnson to the Pacers. Johnson played his first game with the Pacers on December 16, 1972, and became a steadying veteran influence on a young team which went on to win the 1973 ABA championship. He played in 50 games with the Pacers, averaging 6.0 points and 4.9 rebounds, in 15.1 minutes per game. Johnson played alongside 22-year-old future Hall of Famer George McGinnis, Hall of Famer Mel Daniels, Hall of Famer Roger Brown, Freddie Lewis, Donnie Freeman, Darnell Hillman and Billy Keller.

"Gus came to us at the end of his career when he had lost a lot of his physical abilities, but he really wanted a shot at making a run at a championship," recalled Darnell Hillman of Johnson's influence on the Pacers. "And his coming to the team made us that much more solid. He was a great, great individual. The locker room was where he was really an asset. He always knew the right things to say and he could read people. He knew who would be a little bit off or down and he could just bring you right back into focus and send you out on the floor. He was also very instrumental in being like an assistant coach to Slick on the bench. Sometimes when Slick didn't go to the assistant coach, he'd ask Gus."

In the 1973 ABA playoffs, Johnson and the Pacers defeated the Denver Rockets and Ralph Simpson 4–1, and then the Utah Stars with Hall of Famer Zelmo Beaty and ironman Ron Boone 4–2, to advance to the ABA Finals against the Kentucky Colonels with Hall of Famers Artis Gilmore, Dan Issel and Louie Dampier.

The Pacers defeated the Colonels 4–3 in the 1973 ABA Finals to capture the ABA championship, with Johnson playing 13 minutes and grabbing 6 rebounds in the decisive Game 7, an 88–81 Pacers victory at Freedom Hall in Louisville, Kentucky. When Indiana center Daniels was in foul trouble toward the end of Game 7, even with his bad knees, the 35-year-old Johnson was called off the bench to defend Kentucky's Gilmore. Johnson successfully did so, even though Gilmore was 7 ft 2 in (2.18 m) to Johnson's 6 ft 6 in (1.98 m), and 11 years younger than Johnson. It was Johnson's final career game. Overall, Johnson averaged 2.7 points and 4.0 rebounds off the bench during the series against Kentucky.

== Legacy ==
The Naismith Memorial Basketball Hall of Fame entry on Johnson calls him "the model for future athletic power forwards", having "a unique blend of grace, speed, strength, and creativity rarely seen during his era". He was an all-around two-way player who could score and play defense, and had extraordinary jumping ability, becoming one of the earliest players to play above the rim on both offense and defense. Despite chronic knee problems that would limit his games played and shorten his career, Johnson was a member of the NBA All-Star Team five times, the All-NBA second-team four times and the NBA All-Defensive team twice. The award for defensive recognition did not exist during the first five years of his career. During his NBA career, Johnson averaged a double-double, 17.1 points and 12.7 rebounds per game. He scored 1,000 points and had 1,000 rebounds in the same season three times.

In 2023, Johnson was inducted into the Akron Public Schools Athletics Hall of Fame, one year after his former Central High coach Siegferth was given the honor.

His scoring moves around the basket were comparable to those of his peers such as Elgin Baylor and Connie Hawkins. However, Johnson was most effective as a post-up player, with his medium range jump shot, and on the fast break, he was effective as a defender and a rebounder throughout his time in the NBA. Johnson was quick enough to be paired against Oscar Robertson, yet strong enough to defend taller forwards of the NBA in the front line, or even be called upon to defend Wilt Chamberlain. He had an athletic and graceful style of play.

Shortly before his death from an inoperable brain cancer, Johnson's jersey No. 25 was retired by the Washington Bullets on his 48th birthday. A month later he was also honored by the two college programs he played for, Boise State and Idaho, during a conference basketball game between the two teams on January 17, 1987. A crowd of 12,225 at the BSU Pavilion in Boise set a Big Sky attendance record for a regular season game, and the visiting Vandals overcame an eight-point deficit in the second half to win by ten. That month in a ceremony in Akron, his No. 43 was retired by Idaho, the first basketball number retired in school history.

Upon Johnson's death, Abe Pollin, the former owner of the Baltimore Bullets/Washington Wizards franchise said, "I first saw Gus on television ... I had never seen a player dominate a game so. Gus was the Dr. J of his time and anyone that ever had the privilege to see him play will never forget what a great basketball player Gus Johnson was." Before Johnson was selected to the Naismith Hall of Fame, former teammate and Hall of Fame guard Earl Monroe said, "Gus was ahead of his time, flying through the air for slam dunks, breaking backboards and throwing full-court passes behind his back. He was spectacular, but he also did the nitty gritty jobs, defense and rebounding. With all the guys in the Hall of Fame, Gus deserves to be there already."

Former teammate and Hall of Fame center Wes Unseld said of Johnson, "Gus Johnson was one of the greatest players I ever played with or against ... He was a ferocious defender and rebounder, and as a young player, I was completely in awe of his ability. He was truly a star ahead of his time." Unseld and Johnson played next to each other from 1968 to 1972. In 1969–70, they averaged a combined 30.6 rebounds per game (Unseld second in the NBA at 16.7 and Johnson fifth at 13.9); and the following year they averaged a combined 34 rebounds per game, with Johnson averaging 17.1 and Unseld 16.9.

Johnson's Hall of Fame head coach Slick Leonard said, "If he played today, ol' Gussie would be a human highlight film ... That's what people remember the most. But there was a lot more to his game than the spectacular dunks. He was special. He could play, man." New York Knicks Hall of Fame coach Red Holzman thought Johnson was superior to Michael Jordan or Julius Erving in leaping to dunk from the foul line because Johnson did not need an extra step to generate momentum. Hall of Fame coach Alex Hannum called Johnson a "titan" and the strongest player in the NBA pound-for-pound.

New York Knicks Hall of Fame forward Dave DeBusschere, who played against Johnson at forward over Johnson's entire career, said "Gus was probably one of the roughest players I have ever played against. He was not a dirty player. He was one of the most tenacious competitors ever to play the game." The matchup between DeBusschere and Johnson has been called a "study in controlled violence". He and DeBusschere were on the cover of the October 25, 1971, issue of Sports Illustrated, with the caption "The Classic Confrontations".

Oscar Robertson, a member of the NBA's 75th Anniversary Team that included the NBA's 76 greatest players, described Johnson as "'one of the truly great forwards of our time,' ... and one of the best rebounders I've ever seen in my life'". Another all-time great, Bill Russell, compared Johnson to Robertson and Elgin Baylor, for the high level of talent and savvy Johnson had coming into the NBA for the first time. Paul Silas, who was Johnson's rebounding rival in college, and an NBA player and coach, was on the court for the St. Louis Hawks in 1964 when Johnson tore down the basket while dunking. Silas described Johnson as "tremendously gifted," with great jumping ability and strength, who did not fear contact.

== Honors ==
- Inducted into the Naismith Memorial Basketball Hall of Fame (2010)
- Inducted (with Nate Thurmond) into the Akron Public Schools Athletics Hall of Fame (2023)
- Inducted into the Ohio Basketball Hall of Fame (2007)
- Inducted into the University of Idaho Hall of Fame (2007)
- $1.4 million Gus Johnson Community Center opened in Akron (1999)
- Johnson's #43 was retired by the University of Idaho as Johnson was honored during a game between Idaho and his other college, Boise State (1987)
- Johnson's #25 was retired by the Washington Bullets on his birthday, December 13, 1986, months before his death (1987)
- Inducted into the Boise State University Athletic Hall of Fame (1987)

== Death ==
Reflecting on his career months before his death, Johnson expressed that his greatest fear was that he would die and his daughters "don't even know what their daddy did". Johnson died less than four months later at Akron City Hospital on April 29, 1987, at the age of 48. He is buried at Mount Peace Cemetery in Akron. He was survived by his four daughters.

== NBA/ABA career statistics ==
Legend
GP	Games played	GS	Games started	MPG	Minutes per game
FG%	Field goal percentage	3P%	3-point field goal percentage	FT%	Free throw percentage
RPG	Rebounds per game	APG	Assists per game	SPG	Steals per game
BPG	Blocks per game	PPG	Points per game	**Bold**	Career high

†	Denotes seasons in which Johnson won an ABA championship

Year	Team	GP	GS	MPG	FG%	3P%	FT%	RPG	APG	SPG	BPG	PPG
1963–64	Baltimore	**78**	–	36.5	.430	–	.658	13.6	2.2	–	–	17.3
1964–65	Baltimore	76	–	38.1	.418	–	.676	13.0	**3.6**	–	–	18.6
1965–66	Baltimore	41	–	31.3	.413	–	.736	13.3	2.8	–	–	16.5
1966–67	Baltimore	73	–	36.0	.450	–	.708	11.7	2.7	–	–	**20.7**
1967–68	Baltimore	60	–	37.9	**.467**	–	.667	13.0	2.7	–	–	19.1
1968–69	Baltimore	49	–	34.1	.459	–	.717	11.6	2.0	–	–	17.9
1969–70	Baltimore	**78**	–	37.4	.451	–	.724	13.9	3.4	–	–	17.3
1970–71	Baltimore	66	–	**38.5**	.453	–	**.738**	**17.1**	2.9	–	–	18.2
1971–72	Baltimore	39	–	17.1	.383	–	.683	5.8	1.3	–	–	6.4
1972–73	Phoenix	21	–	19.9	.381	–	.694	6.5	1.5	–	–	7.8
1972–73†	Indiana (ABA)	50	–	15.1	.441	**.190**	**.738**	4.9	1.2	–	–	6.0
Career		631	–	33.1	.440	.190	.700	12.1	2.5	–	–	16.2
All-Star		5	0	19.8	.429	–	.760	7.0	1.2	–	–	13.4

=== Playoffs ===
Year	Team	GP	GS	MPG	FG%	3P%	FT%	RPG	APG	SPG	BPG	PPG
1965	Baltimore	10	–	37.7	.358	–	.739	11.1	**3.4**	–	–	15.8
1966	Baltimore	1	–	8.0	.250	–	–	.0	.0	–	–	2.0
1970	Baltimore	7	–	**42.6**	**.459**	–	.794	**11.4**	1.3	–	–	**18.4**
1971	Baltimore	11	–	33.2	.422	–	.745	10.4	2.7	–	–	13.0
1972	Baltimore	5	–	15.4	.300	–	**1.000**	5.0	.6	–	–	4.0
1973†	Indiana (ABA)	**17**	–	10.8	.254	.000	.750	4.1	.9	–	–	2.5
Career		51	–	25.7	.380	.000	.759	7.8	1.8	–	–	9.7
