= 1962–63 Notre Dame Fighting Irish men's basketball team =

American college basketball season

1962–63 Notre Dame Fighting Irish men's basketball

NCAA tournament, Regional semifinals, L 72–77 vs. Bowling Green
- Conference: Independent
- Record: 17–9
- Head coach: John Jordan
- Home arena: Notre Dame Fieldhouse

1962–63 NCAA University Division men's basketball independents standings
	Conf.				Overall
Team	W		L	PCT	W		L	PCT
No. 3 Loyola (Ill.)		–		–	29	–	2	.935
Providence		–		–	24	–	4	.857
Miami (FL)		–		–	23	–	5	.821
Colorado State		–		–	18	–	5	.783
Seattle		–		–	21	–	6	.778
Niagara		–		–	14	–	4	.778
Idaho		–		–	20	–	6	.769
Pittsburgh		–		–	19	–	6	.760
Penn State		–		–	15	–	5	.750
Utah State		–		–	20	–	7	.741
Canisius		–		–	19	–	7	.731
Memphis		–		–	19	–	7	.731
Texas Western		–		–	19	–	7	.731
Oregon State		–		–	22	–	9	.710
Seton Hall		–		–	16	–	7	.696
Marquette		–		–	20	–	9	.690
Oklahoma City		–		–	19	–	10	.655
Villanova		–		–	19	–	10	.655
Notre Dame		–		–	17	–	9	.654
DePaul		–		–	15	–	8	.652
Holy Cross		–		–	16	–	9	.640
Iona		–		–	12	–	7	.632
Regis		–		–	15	–	9	.625
Butler		–		–	16	–	10	.615
Dayton		–		–	16	–	10	.615
Florida State		–		–	15	–	10	.600
Duquesne		–		–	13	–	9	.591
Houston		–		–	15	–	11	.577
Louisville		–		–	14	–	11	.560
Detroit		–		–	14	–	12	.538
Gonzaga		–		–	14	–	12	.538
Boston University		–		–	10	–	9	.526
St. Bonaventure		–		–	13	–	12	.520
Creighton		–		–	14	–	13	.519
Georgetown		–		–	13	–	13	.500
Montana State		–		–	13	–	13	.500
Loyola (LA)		–		–	12	–	12	.500
Navy		–		–	9	–	9	.500
Centenary		–		–	12	–	14	.462
Air Force		–		–	10	–	12	.455
Saint Francis (PA)		–		–	10	–	13	.435
Xavier		–		–	12	–	16	.429
Oregon		–		–	11	–	15	.423
Army		–		–	8	–	11	.421
Boston College		–		–	10	–	16	.385
Hardin–Simmons		–		–	10	–	16	.385
Syracuse		–		–	8	–	13	.381
Idaho State		–		–	9	–	15	.375
Portland		–		–	8	–	18	.308
Rutgers		–		–	7	–	16	.304
Colgate		–		–	5	–	13	.278
Montana		–		–	6	–	18	.250
West Texas State		–		–	6	–	18	.250
Denver		–		–	6	–	19	.240
Washington State		–		–	5	–	20	.200
New Mexico State		–		–	4	–	17	.190
Rankings from AP Poll

The 1962–63 Notre Dame Fighting Irish men's basketball team represented the University of Notre Dame during the 1962–63 men's college basketball season.

== Schedule ==
Date time, TV	Rank^{#}	Opponent^{#}	Result	Record	High points	High rebounds	High assists	Site (attendance) city, state
December 1		St. Joseph's (IN)	W 87–73	1–0	35 – Reed	–	–	Notre Dame Fieldhouse; South Bend, IN
December 4		Michigan State	W 92–85	2–0	24 – Matthews	–	–	Notre Dame Fieldhouse; South Bend, IN
December 6		St. Francis (PA)	W 101–70	3–0	20 – Matthews	–	–	Notre Dame Fieldhouse; South Bend, IN
December 8		at Valparaiso	W 102–90	4–0	24 – Matthews	–	–	
December 11		Western Michigan	W 82–68	5–0	27 – Sahm	–	–	Notre Dame Fieldhouse; South Bend, IN
December 13		Creighton	W 74–48	6–0	20 – Andreoli	–	–	Notre Dame Fieldhouse; South Bend, IN
December 22		at Butler	L 59–66	6–1	15 – Sheffield	–	–	
December 29		at Kentucky	L 70–78	6–2	28 – Sheffield	–	–	Lexington, KY
December 31		vs. No. 3 Illinois	W 90–88	7–2	23 – Andreoli	–	–	Chicago Stadium (10,346); Chicago, IL
January 2		vs. Indiana	W 73–70	8–2	19 – Miller	–	–	Memorial Coliseum; Fort Wayne, IN
January 5		North Carolina	L 68–76 ^{OT}	8–3	21 – Miller	–	–	Notre Dame Fieldhouse; South Bend, IN
January 9		DePaul	W 82–62	9–3	21 – Sheffield	–	–	Notre Dame Fieldhouse; South Bend, IN
January 12		Detroit	W 105–70	10–3	25 – Reed	–	–	Notre Dame Fieldhouse; South Bend, IN
January 14		Butler	W 80–54	11–3	18 – Tied	–	–	Notre Dame Fieldhouse; South Bend, IN
January 16		at DePaul	L 69–83	11–4	18 – Andreoli	–	–	
January 21		vs. Purdue	W 96–86	12–4	28 – Sahm	–	–	Fort Wayne, IN
February 7		at Boston College	W 74–66	13–4	22 – Sahm	–	–	Chestnut Hill, MA
February 9		at St. John's	L 52–57	13–5	13 – Sahm	–	–	
February 13		Gannon	W 82–47	14–5	16 – Tied	–	–	Notre Dame Fieldhouse; South Bend, IN
February 16		Navy	W 68–56	15–5	24 – Andreoli	–	–	Notre Dame Fieldhouse; South Bend, IN
February 18		at Bowling Green	L 58–67	15–6	15 – Sahm	–	–	
February 21		vs. NYU	L 79–80	15–7	22 – Jesewitz	–	–	Madison Square Garden; New York, NY
February 23		at Detroit	W 83–79	16–7	25 – Matthews	–	–	
February 27		Evansville	W 78–72	17–7	23 – Tied	–	–	Notre Dame Fieldhouse; South Bend, IN
March 2		vs. Bradley	L 66–72	17–8	18 – Andreoli	–	–	Chicago Stadium; Chicago, IL
March 11		vs. Bowling Green; NCAA tournament	L 72–77	17–9	23 – Matthews	–	–	Evanston, IL
*Non-conference game. ^{#}Rankings from AP Poll. (#) Tournament seedings in parentheses.

== Roster ==
1962–63 Notre Dame Fighting Irish men's basketball team
Players
Coaches

Pos.	#	Name	Height	Weight	Year	Previous school	Hometown
G/F	33	John Andreoli (C)	6 ft 3 in (1.91 m)	185 lb (84 kg)	Sr	Father Judge	Philadelphia, PA
G	34	Jim Affeldt	6 ft 1 in (1.85 m)	175 lb (79 kg)	So	Regis	Cedar Rapids, IA
G	15	Owen Dowd	6 ft 2 in (1.88 m)	190 lb (86 kg)	So	St. Agnes	Rockville Centre, NY
G	11	Pat Dudgeon	6 ft 2 in (1.88 m)	185 lb (84 kg)	So	Good Shepherd	Frankfort, KY
F	21	Dick Erlenbaugh	6 ft 3 in (1.91 m)	190 lb (86 kg)	Jr	Immaculate Conception	Villa Park, IL
C	20	Larry Jesewitz	6 ft 8 in (2.03 m)	220 lb (100 kg)	So	Gage Park	Chicago, IL
F	22	Ed Malloy	6 ft 4 in (1.93 m)	190 lb (86 kg)	Sr	Archbishop Carroll	Washington, D.C.
G	10	John Matthews (C)	6 ft 0 in (1.83 m)	175 lb (79 kg)	Sr	Christian Brothers	Watervliet, NY
F	30	Jay Miller	6 ft 4 in (1.93 m)	190 lb (86 kg)	So	Goshen	Goshen, IN
F	32	Ron Reed	6 ft 5 in (1.96 m)	195 lb (88 kg)	So	LaPorte	LaPorte, IN
F/C	25	Walt Sahm	6 ft 9 in (2.06 m)	235 lb (107 kg)	So	Cathedral	Indianapolis, IN
G	14	Larry Sheffield	6 ft 0 in (1.83 m)	167 lb (76 kg)	So	LaSalle	Troy, NY
F	23	Sam Skarich	6 ft 4 in (1.93 m)	185 lb (84 kg)	Jr	Keewatin	Keewatin, MN

Head coach

- John Jordan

Assistant coach(es)

- Chuck Lennon

Legend

- (C) Team captain
- (S) Suspended
- (I) Ineligible
- (W) Walk-on
- Injured
- Current redshirt

Roster
Last update: 17 January 2016
