= 1962–63 Georgetown Hoyas men's basketball team =

American college basketball season

1962–63 Georgetown Hoyas men's basketball
- Conference: Independent
- Record: 13–13
- Head coach: Tommy O'Keefe (3rd season)
- Assistant coach: Tom Coleman (2nd season)
- Captain: Ed Lopata
- Home arena: McDonough Gymnasium

1962–63 NCAA University Division men's basketball independents standings
	Conf.				Overall
Team	W		L	PCT	W		L	PCT
No. 3 Loyola (Ill.)		–		–	29	–	2	.935
Providence		–		–	24	–	4	.857
Miami (FL)		–		–	23	–	5	.821
Colorado State		–		–	18	–	5	.783
Seattle		–		–	21	–	6	.778
Niagara		–		–	14	–	4	.778
Idaho		–		–	20	–	6	.769
Pittsburgh		–		–	19	–	6	.760
Penn State		–		–	15	–	5	.750
Utah State		–		–	20	–	7	.741
Canisius		–		–	19	–	7	.731
Memphis		–		–	19	–	7	.731
Texas Western		–		–	19	–	7	.731
Oregon State		–		–	22	–	9	.710
Seton Hall		–		–	16	–	7	.696
Marquette		–		–	20	–	9	.690
Oklahoma City		–		–	19	–	10	.655
Villanova		–		–	19	–	10	.655
Notre Dame		–		–	17	–	9	.654
DePaul		–		–	15	–	8	.652
Holy Cross		–		–	16	–	9	.640
Iona		–		–	12	–	7	.632
Regis		–		–	15	–	9	.625
Butler		–		–	16	–	10	.615
Dayton		–		–	16	–	10	.615
Florida State		–		–	15	–	10	.600
Duquesne		–		–	13	–	9	.591
Houston		–		–	15	–	11	.577
Louisville		–		–	14	–	11	.560
Detroit		–		–	14	–	12	.538
Gonzaga		–		–	14	–	12	.538
Boston University		–		–	10	–	9	.526
St. Bonaventure		–		–	13	–	12	.520
Creighton		–		–	14	–	13	.519
Georgetown		–		–	13	–	13	.500
Montana State		–		–	13	–	13	.500
Loyola (LA)		–		–	12	–	12	.500
Navy		–		–	9	–	9	.500
Centenary		–		–	12	–	14	.462
Air Force		–		–	10	–	12	.455
Saint Francis (PA)		–		–	10	–	13	.435
Xavier		–		–	12	–	16	.429
Oregon		–		–	11	–	15	.423
Army		–		–	8	–	11	.421
Boston College		–		–	10	–	16	.385
Hardin–Simmons		–		–	10	–	16	.385
Syracuse		–		–	8	–	13	.381
Idaho State		–		–	9	–	15	.375
Portland		–		–	8	–	18	.308
Rutgers		–		–	7	–	16	.304
Colgate		–		–	5	–	13	.278
Montana		–		–	6	–	18	.250
West Texas State		–		–	6	–	18	.250
Denver		–		–	6	–	19	.240
Washington State		–		–	5	–	20	.200
New Mexico State		–		–	4	–	17	.190
Rankings from AP Poll

The 1962–63 Georgetown Hoyas men's basketball team represented Georgetown University during the 1962–63 NCAA University Division college basketball season. Tommy O'Keefe coached them in his third season as head coach, but Georgetown's head coaching position paid so little that he could only coach part-time and held a full-time job outside of coaching in order to meet his financial obligations, impairing his ability to recruit players. The team was an independent and played its home games at McDonough Gymnasium on the Georgetown campus in Washington, D.C. It finished with a record of 13–13 and had no post-season play.

== Season recap ==
After a successful 1961–62 season, Georgetown lost a school-record eight seniors to graduation. The departed players had been responsible for 79.9% of the team's scoring. Only two lettermen returned for 1962–63, and the only starter to return was the point guard, junior guard Jim Christy. In order to complete his roster, O'Keefe had to put five walk-ons on the 1962–63 team and rely on six newcomers in all.

Christy and sophomore forward Jim Barry – newly arrived on the varsity team after a year on the freshman team, and became significant contributors to Georgetown men's basketball's "Classic Era" (1943–1972). They were the main scoring threats on the team. They scored a combined 1,000 points during the 1962–63 season, and their performance allowed the inexperienced team to avoid a disastrous season in a rebuilding year.

Barry made his varsity debut in the first game of the season against St. Joseph's and scored 29 points, which remains the school scoring record for a debut game. Through the first eight games, he averaged 16.5 points per game, the best on the team. Despite his efforts, however, the Hoyas returned home with a record of 2–7 after losing both their games in the Motor City Classic in Detroit, Michigan. Barry then began to turn in a lengthy list of high-scoring performances, and Georgetown embarked on a six-game winning streak – the longest Georgetown winning streak since the 1952–53 team opened 6–0 – that pushed its record to 8–7. During the streak, Barry averaged 28.9 points per game and scored 31 points against Loyola and 41 against Navy.

The winning streak ended with Georgetown losing all three games during a tough road trip in which they visited Niagara, Syracuse, and Maryland. Barry averaged 25.7 points per game in the three losses. Coming home with an 8–10 record, the Hoyas began another winning streak, winning five straight to move to 13–10 on the year, with Barry scoring 39 points against Manhattan and 21, 22, 25, and 28 points in the other four wins.

For his part, Jim Christy appeared in 24 games and scored in double figures in 22 of them. His top games of the year included 26 points against Maryland, 34 against Holy Cross, and 32 against Rhode Island.

The Hoyas closed out the season with three straight losses, but Barry had one more great performance. In the second-to-last game of the year, Georgetown visited La Salle at the Palestra in Philadelphia, Pennsylvania, on February 26, 1963. Barry scored 30 points, and Philadelphia-area sportswriters judged it the best performance of the year at the Palestra, exceeding even the accomplishments there of Princeton's Bill Bradley and New York University's Barry Kramer during the season. Jim Barry ended the season scoring 20 or more points in 16 games and 30 or more points in six games, averaging a school-record 22.8 points per game, fourth among all sophomores in the United States.

The team finished with a record of 13–13, the only team that did not have a winning record in O'Keefe's six seasons as head coach. However, it was a creditable record against a tough schedule in a rebuilding year that saw them win 11 of their last 17 games.

The team was not ranked in the Top 20 in the Associated Press Poll or Coaches' Poll at any time.

== Roster ==
From the 1958–59 season through the 1967–68 season, Georgetown players wore even-numbered jerseys for home games and odd-numbered ones for away games; for example, a player would wear No. 10 at home and No. 11 on the road. Players are listed below by the even numbers they wore at home.

#	Name	Height	Weight (lbs.)	Position	Class	Hometown	Previous team(s)
4	Jim Barry	6"6"	195	F	So.	Elizabeth, NJ, U.S.	St. Peter's Preparatory School
10	Jim Christy	6"1"	185	G	Jr.	Brooklyn, NY, U.S.	Saint Pascal HS
12	Joe Franz	6"5"	N/A	F	So.	Baltimore, MD, U.S.	Loyola HS
14	John Prendergast	N/A	N/A	G	So.	Utica, NY, U.S.	Notre Dame Junior Senior HS
20	Joe Mazelin	6'2"	N/A	G	Jr.	Indianapolis, IN, U.S.	Sacred Heart HS
22	John Brogan	6"1"	N/A	G	Jr.	South Orange, NJ, U.S.	Saint Benedict's Preparatory School
24	Charles "Buddy" O'Donnell	6'3"	N/A	F	Jr.	Upper Darby, PA, U.S.	Monsignor Bonner HS
30	Bill Fox	6'2"	N/A	F	Sr.	Auburn, NY, U.S.	Auburn HS
30	Owen McGuill	N/A	N/A	G	Sr.	Hampden, MA, U.S.	Catholic High School
32	Chuck Devlin	6'5"	N/A	F	Jr.	Philadelphia, PA, U.S.	Germantown Academy
34	Ed Lopata	6'5"	N/A	F	Sr.	Vandergrift, PA, U.S.	Vandergrift HS
40	Jerry Moriarity	N/A	N/A	G	So.	Franklinville, NY, U.S.	Ten Broeck Academy
42	Pardie Abadie	6'3"	N/A	F/C	Sr.	Washington, DC, U.S.	Archbishop Carroll HS
44	Bill Hodgman	N/A	N/A	F/C	Jr.	Grosse Pointe, MI, U.S.	Austin HS
50	Tom Cradock	6'4"	N/A	G	So.	St. Louis, MO, U.S.	University HS

== 1962–63 schedule and results ==
Date time, TV	Rank^{#}	Opponent^{#}	Result	Record	Site city, state
Regular Season
Sat., Dec. 1, 1962 no, no		St. Joseph's	L 74–81	0-1	McDonough Gymnasium; Washington, DC
Tue., Dec. 4, 1962 no, no		Maryland	W 79–70	1-1	McDonough Gymnasium; Washington, DC
Fri., Dec. 7, 1962 no, no		at New York University	L 65–85	1-2	Madison Square Garden; New York, NY
Tue., Dec. 11, 1962 no, no		Duquesne	L 56–68	1-3	McDonough Gymnasium; Washington, DC
Thu., Dec. 13, 1962 no, no		George Washington	L 67–73	1-4	McDonough Gymnasium; Washington, DC
Mon., Dec. 17, 1962 no, no		at Rutgers	W 84–79	2-4	College Avenue Gymnasium; New Brunswick, NJ
Wed., Dec. 19, 1962 no, no		at Army	L 68–72	2-5	Hayes Gymnasium; West Point, NY
Fri., Dec. 28, 1962 no, no		vs. Detroit; Motor City Tournament	L 82–103	2-6	Cobo Hall; Detroit, MI
Sat., Dec. 29, 1962 no, no		vs. Western Michigan; Motor City Tournament	L 77–85	2-7	Cobo Hall; Detroit, MI
Thu., Jan. 3, 1963 no, no		Loyola Maryland	W 108–83	3-7	McDonough Gymnasium; Washington, DC
Sat., Jan. 5, 1963 no, no		at George Washington	W 72–60	4-7	Fort Myer Gymnasium; Fort Myer, VA
Tue., Jan. 8, 1963 no, no		at American	W 82–78	5-7	Washington Coliseum; Washington, DC
Sat., Jan. 12, 1963 no, no		Boston College	W 71–58	6-7	McDonough Gymnasium; Washington, DC
Wed., Jan. 16, 1963 no, no		Navy	W 83–71	7-7	McDonough Gymnasium; Washington, DC
Sat., Jan. 19, 1963 no, no		Fordham	W 74–70	8-7	McDonough Gymnasium; Washington, DC
Thu., Jan. 31, 1963 no, no		at Niagara	L 75–89	8-8	Buffalo Memorial Auditorium; Buffalo, NY
Sat., Feb. 2, 1963 no, no		at Syracuse; Rivalry	L 70–76	8-9	Onondaga War Memorial; Syracuse, NY
Mon., Feb. 4, 1963 no, no		at Maryland	L 72–73	8-10	Cole Field House; College Park, MD
Wed., Feb. 6, 1963 no, no		Loyola New Orleans	W 72–70	9-10	McDonough Gymnasium; Washington, DC
Sun., Feb. 10, 1963 no, no		Holy Cross	W 85–84	10-10	McDonough Gymnasium; Washington, DC
Sat., Feb. 16, 1963 no, no		Manhattan	W 89–87	11-10	McDonough Gymnasium; Washington, DC
Wed., Feb. 20, 1963 no, no		Lafayette	W 89–58	12-10	McDonough Gymnasium; Washington, DC
Fri., Feb. 22, 1963 no, no		at Fairfield	W 79–61	13-10	New Haven Arena; New Haven, CT
Sat., Feb. 23, 1963 no, no		at Rhode Island	L 84–97	13-11	Keaney Gymnasium; Kingston, RI
Tue., Feb. 26, 1963 no, no		at La Salle	L 72–75	13-12	Palestra; Philadelphia, PA
Sat., Mar. 2, 1963 no, no		Seton Hall	L 76–78	13-13	McDonough Gymnasium; Washington, DC
*Non-conference game. ^{#}Rankings from AP Poll. (#) Tournament seedings in parentheses.
