= 1962–63 Loyola Ramblers men's basketball team =

American college basketball season

1962–63 Loyola Ramblers men's basketball
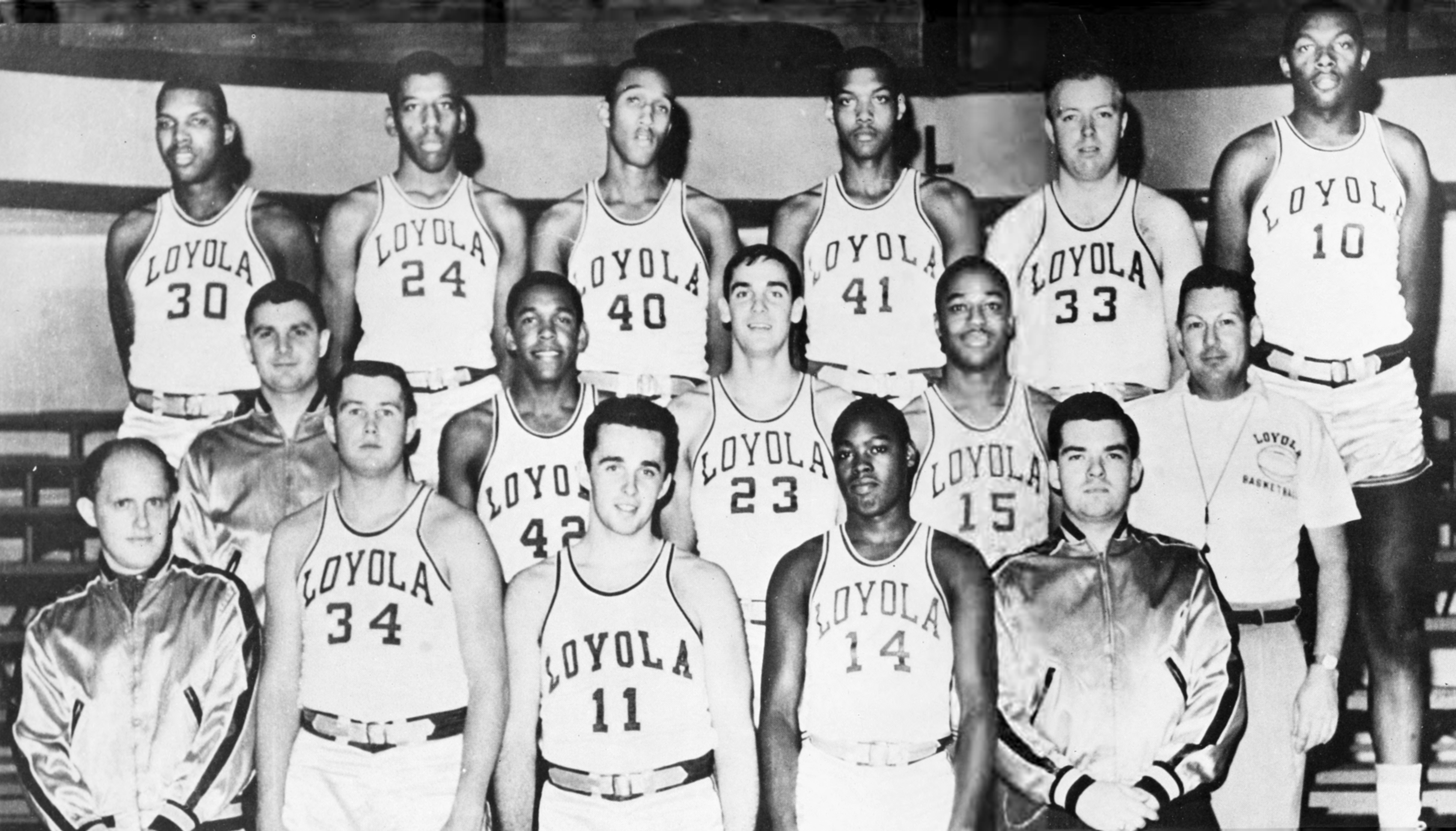

NCAA tournament National Champions

National Championship Game, W 60–58 ^{OT} vs. Cincinnati
- Conference: Independent

Ranking
- Coaches: No. 4
- AP: No. 3
- Record: 29–2
- Head coach: George Ireland (12th season)
- Assistant coaches: Jerry Lyne; Nick Kladis

1962–63 NCAA University Division men's basketball independents standings
	Conf.				Overall
Team	W		L	PCT	W		L	PCT
No. 3 Loyola (Ill.)		–		–	29	–	2	.935
Providence		–		–	24	–	4	.857
Miami (FL)		–		–	23	–	5	.821
Colorado State		–		–	18	–	5	.783
Seattle		–		–	21	–	6	.778
Niagara		–		–	14	–	4	.778
Idaho		–		–	20	–	6	.769
Pittsburgh		–		–	19	–	6	.760
Penn State		–		–	15	–	5	.750
Utah State		–		–	20	–	7	.741
Canisius		–		–	19	–	7	.731
Memphis		–		–	19	–	7	.731
Texas Western		–		–	19	–	7	.731
Oregon State		–		–	22	–	9	.710
Seton Hall		–		–	16	–	7	.696
Marquette		–		–	20	–	9	.690
Oklahoma City		–		–	19	–	10	.655
Villanova		–		–	19	–	10	.655
Notre Dame		–		–	17	–	9	.654
DePaul		–		–	15	–	8	.652
Holy Cross		–		–	16	–	9	.640
Iona		–		–	12	–	7	.632
Regis		–		–	15	–	9	.625
Butler		–		–	16	–	10	.615
Dayton		–		–	16	–	10	.615
Florida State		–		–	15	–	10	.600
Duquesne		–		–	13	–	9	.591
Houston		–		–	15	–	11	.577
Louisville		–		–	14	–	11	.560
Detroit		–		–	14	–	12	.538
Gonzaga		–		–	14	–	12	.538
Boston University		–		–	10	–	9	.526
St. Bonaventure		–		–	13	–	12	.520
Creighton		–		–	14	–	13	.519
Georgetown		–		–	13	–	13	.500
Montana State		–		–	13	–	13	.500
Loyola (LA)		–		–	12	–	12	.500
Navy		–		–	9	–	9	.500
Centenary		–		–	12	–	14	.462
Air Force		–		–	10	–	12	.455
Saint Francis (PA)		–		–	10	–	13	.435
Xavier		–		–	12	–	16	.429
Oregon		–		–	11	–	15	.423
Army		–		–	8	–	11	.421
Boston College		–		–	10	–	16	.385
Hardin–Simmons		–		–	10	–	16	.385
Syracuse		–		–	8	–	13	.381
Idaho State		–		–	9	–	15	.375
Portland		–		–	8	–	18	.308
Rutgers		–		–	7	–	16	.304
Colgate		–		–	5	–	13	.278
Montana		–		–	6	–	18	.250
West Texas State		–		–	6	–	18	.250
Denver		–		–	6	–	19	.240
Washington State		–		–	5	–	20	.200
New Mexico State		–		–	4	–	17	.190
Rankings from AP Poll

The 1962–63 Loyola Ramblers men's basketball team represented Loyola University Chicago. Champions of the 1963 NCAA tournament, the Ramblers were coached by George Ireland. They defeated top-ranked and two-time defending champion Cincinnati Bearcats in a 60–58 overtime contest. The 1962–63 Ramblers were one of the first NCAA men's basketball teams to have broken the so-called "gentlemen's agreement" among coaches in which no more than two black players would be on the floor at one time (and in some road games, black players would have to rotate so that only one of them was playing at any given moment): the Ramblers would regularly have three or four black starters, paving the way for the 1965–66 Texas Western Miners men's basketball team who would finally put the "agreement" to rest and have an all-black starting five. They played in the Game of Change, in which a Mississippi State team defied segregationists to play against Loyola, breaking the unwritten law that Mississippi teams would not play against black players.

On July 11, 2013, to commemorate the 50th anniversary of their championship, surviving members of Loyola's team were honored by President Barack Obama in a ceremony at the Oval Office of the White House. It also was announced that the entire team would be inducted in the College Basketball Hall of Fame in a ceremony scheduled for November 2013.

== Roster ==
Name	#	Position	Height	Year	Hometown
Dan Connaughton	34			Sophomore	Hamilton, Ohio
Jack Egan	11	Guard	5–10	Junior	Chicago, Ill.
Jerry Harkness	15	Forward	6–3	Senior	Bronx, N.Y.
Les Hunter	41	Center	6–7	Junior	Nashville, Tenn.
Earl Johnson (Note: Dropped out of school early in the spring semester, citing financial troubles)	30			Sophomore	
Ron Miller	42	Guard	6–2	Junior	Bronx, N.Y.
Jim Reardon	33			Senior	
Pablo Robertson (Note: Ruled academically ineligible after the fall semester)	14	Guard	5–7	Sophomore	Bronx, N.Y.
Rich Rochelle	10	Center	6–9	Junior	
Vic Rouse	40	Forward	6–6	Junior	Nashville, Tenn.
Billy Smith	24	Forward	6–5	Sophomore	
Chuck Wood	23			Junior	

== Schedule ==
Date time, TV	Rank^{#}	Opponent^{#}	Result	Record	Site (attendance) city, state
December 1, 1962*	No. 4	Christian Brothers	W 114–58	1–0	Alumni Gym; Chicago, IL
December 3, 1962*	No. 4	North Dakota	W 110–56	2–0	Alumni Gym; Chicago, IL
December 10, 1962*	No. 4	Milwaukee	W 107–47	3–0	Alumni Gym; Chicago, IL
December 15, 1962*	No. 4	South Dakota	W 105–58	4–0	Alumni Gym; Chicago, IL
December 17, 1962*	No. 4	Western Michigan	W 123–102	5–0	Alumni Gym; Chicago, IL
December 19, 1962*	No. 4	at Indiana	W 106–94	6–0	Gladstein Fieldhouse; Bloomington, IN
December 22, 1962*	No. 4	#10 Seattle	W 93–83	7–0	Chicago Stadium; Chicago, IL
December 26, 1962*	No. 3	Arkansas; All-College Tournament	W 81–62	8–0	Municipal Auditorium; Oklahoma City, OK
December 27, 1962*	No. 3	Memphis State; All-College Tournament	W 94–82	9–0	Municipal Auditorium; Oklahoma City, OK
December 28, 1962*	No. 3	Wyoming; All-College Tournament Championship	W 93–82	10–0	Municipal Auditorium; Oklahoma City, OK
December 31, 1962*	No. 3	Dayton	W 74–69	11–0	Alumni Gym; Chicago, IL
January 3, 1963*	No. 2	Marshall	W 103–58	12–0	Alumni Gym; Chicago, IL
January 5, 1963*	No. 2	Loyola (LA)	W 88–53	13–0	Alumni Gym; Chicago, IL
January 8, 1963*	No. 2	at Marquette	W 87–68	14–0	Milwaukee, WI
January 10, 1963*	No. 2	at Western Michigan	W 107–69	15–0	University Arena; Kalamazoo, MI
January 19, 1963*	No. 2	at Kent State	W 96–55	16–0	Memorial Gymnasium; Kent, OH
January 21, 1963*	No. 2	at Ohio	W 80–72	17–0	Grover Center; Athens, OH
January 26, 1963*	No. 2	Santa Clara	W 82–72	18–0	Chicago Stadium; Chicago, IL
January 31, 1963*	No. 2	Washington (MO)	W 118–58	19–0	Alumni Gym; Chicago, IL
February 2, 1963*	No. 2	Iowa	W 86–68	20–0	Chicago Stadium; Chicago, IL
February 12, 1963*	No. 2	Marquette	W 92–90^{OT}	21–0	Chicago Stadium; Chicago, IL
February 16, 1963*	No. 2	at Bowling Green	L 75–92	21–1	Anderson Arena; Bowling Green, OH
February 18, 1963*	No. 2	at St. John's	W 70–47	22–1	Alumni Hall; Queens, NY
February 23, 1963*	No. 3	at Houston	W 62–58	23–1	Jeppesen Gymnasium; Houston, TX
February 27, 1963*	No. 3	Ohio	W 114–94	24–1	Alumni Gym; Chicago, IL
March 2, 1963*	No. 3	#8 Wichita State	L 72–73	24–2	Chicago Stadium; Chicago, IL
NCAA Tournament
March 11, 1963*	No. 5	vs. Tennessee Tech; NCAA mideast regional quarterfinal	W 111–42	25–2	McGaw Hall; Evanston, IL
March 15, 1963*	No. 3	vs. No. 7 Mississippi State; NCAA mideast regional semifinal "Game of Change"	W 61–51	26–2	Jenison Fieldhouse (12,143); East Lansing, MI
March 16, 1963*	No. 3	vs. No. 8 Illinois; NCAA mideast regional final	W 79–64	27–2	Jenison Fieldhouse; East Lansing, MI
March 22, 1963*	No. 3	vs. No. 2 Duke; NCAA national semifinal	W 94–75	28–2	Freedom Hall; Louisville, KY
March 23, 1963*	No. 3	vs. No. 1 Cincinnati; NCAA national championship	W 60–58^{OT}	29–2	Freedom Hall (19,153); Louisville, KY
*Non-conference game. ^{#}Rankings from AP Poll. (#) Tournament seedings in parentheses. All times are in Central Standard Time. Source: 2018–19 Loyola men's basketball media guide

== Awards and honors ==
Jerry Harkness:

- Consensus First Team All-American
- First Team AP All-American
- First Team USBWA All-American
- First Team NABC All-American
- First Team UPI All-American
- Second Team NEA All-American

Team:

- College Basketball Hall of Fame (2013)

== Records ==
Loyola's first-round Mideast Regional victory over Tennessee Tech, 111–42, continues to be the record margin of victory (69 points) in an NCAA men's basketball tournament game.

== NBA draft ==
Round	Pick	Player	NBA club
2	9	Jerry Harkness	New York Knicks
