= 1962–63 Oregon State Beavers men's basketball team =

American college basketball season

1962–63 Oregon State Beavers men's basketball

NCAA tournament, Final Four
- Conference: Independent

Ranking
- Coaches: No. 14
- Record: 22–9
- Head coach: Slats Gill (35th season)
- Home arena: Oregon State Coliseum

1962–63 NCAA University Division men's basketball independents standings
	Conf.				Overall
Team	W		L	PCT	W		L	PCT
No. 3 Loyola (Ill.)		–		–	29	–	2	.935
Providence		–		–	24	–	4	.857
Miami (FL)		–		–	23	–	5	.821
Colorado State		–		–	18	–	5	.783
Seattle		–		–	21	–	6	.778
Niagara		–		–	14	–	4	.778
Idaho		–		–	20	–	6	.769
Pittsburgh		–		–	19	–	6	.760
Penn State		–		–	15	–	5	.750
Utah State		–		–	20	–	7	.741
Canisius		–		–	19	–	7	.731
Memphis		–		–	19	–	7	.731
Texas Western		–		–	19	–	7	.731
Oregon State		–		–	22	–	9	.710
Seton Hall		–		–	16	–	7	.696
Marquette		–		–	20	–	9	.690
Oklahoma City		–		–	19	–	10	.655
Villanova		–		–	19	–	10	.655
Notre Dame		–		–	17	–	9	.654
DePaul		–		–	15	–	8	.652
Holy Cross		–		–	16	–	9	.640
Iona		–		–	12	–	7	.632
Regis		–		–	15	–	9	.625
Butler		–		–	16	–	10	.615
Dayton		–		–	16	–	10	.615
Florida State		–		–	15	–	10	.600
Duquesne		–		–	13	–	9	.591
Houston		–		–	15	–	11	.577
Louisville		–		–	14	–	11	.560
Detroit		–		–	14	–	12	.538
Gonzaga		–		–	14	–	12	.538
Boston University		–		–	10	–	9	.526
St. Bonaventure		–		–	13	–	12	.520
Creighton		–		–	14	–	13	.519
Georgetown		–		–	13	–	13	.500
Montana State		–		–	13	–	13	.500
Loyola (LA)		–		–	12	–	12	.500
Navy		–		–	9	–	9	.500
Centenary		–		–	12	–	14	.462
Air Force		–		–	10	–	12	.455
Saint Francis (PA)		–		–	10	–	13	.435
Xavier		–		–	12	–	16	.429
Oregon		–		–	11	–	15	.423
Army		–		–	8	–	11	.421
Boston College		–		–	10	–	16	.385
Hardin–Simmons		–		–	10	–	16	.385
Syracuse		–		–	8	–	13	.381
Idaho State		–		–	9	–	15	.375
Portland		–		–	8	–	18	.308
Rutgers		–		–	7	–	16	.304
Colgate		–		–	5	–	13	.278
Montana		–		–	6	–	18	.250
West Texas State		–		–	6	–	18	.250
Denver		–		–	6	–	19	.240
Washington State		–		–	5	–	20	.200
New Mexico State		–		–	4	–	17	.190
Rankings from AP Poll

The 1962–63 Oregon State Beavers men's basketball team represented Oregon State University in Corvallis, Oregon, during the 1962–63 season.

Led by head coach Slats Gill – serving in his 35th of 36 seasons – and big man Mel Counts, the Beavers participated in the 1963 NCAA Tournament and reached the second Final Four in school history. Guard Terry Baker became the first college football Heisman Trophy winner to play in the NCAA tournament's Final Four.

== Roster ==
1962–63 Oregon State Beavers men's basketball team
Players
Coaches

Pos.	#	Name	Height	Weight	Year	Previous school	Hometown
C	21	Mel Counts	7 ft 0 in (2.13 m)	230 lb (104 kg)	Jr	Marshfield	Coos Bay, Oregon
G	24	Terry Baker	6 ft 3 in (1.91 m)	—	Sr	Jefferson	Portland, Oregon

Head coach

- Slats Gill (Oregon State)

Assistant coach(es)

Legend

- (C) Team captain
- (S) Suspended
- (I) Ineligible
- (W) Walk-on
- Injured
- Current redshirt

== Schedule and results ==
Date time, TV	Rank^{#}	Opponent^{#}	Result	Record	Site (attendance) city, state
Regular season
Dec 7, 1962*	No. 7	at Seattle	L 58–60	0–1	Washington State Coliseum; Seattle, Washington
Dec 8, 1962*	No. 7	at Washington	W 57–45	1–1	Hec Edmundson Pavilion; Seattle, Washington
Dec 14, 1962*	No. 9	California	L 59–61	1–2	Oregon State Coliseum; Corvallis, Oregon
Dec 15, 1962*	No. 9	California	W 70–60	2–2	Oregon State Coliseum; Corvallis, Oregon
Dec 21, 1962*		vs. No. 7 West Virginia; Kentucky Invitational	L 65–70	2–3	Memorial Coliseum; Lexington, Kentucky
Dec 22, 1962*		vs. Iowa; Kentucky Invitational	W 61–55	3–3	Memorial Coliseum; Lexington, Kentucky
Dec 26, 1962*		vs. Idaho; Far West Classic	W 80–53	4–3	Memorial Coliseum (12,129); Portland, Oregon
Dec 28, 1962*		vs. California; Far West Classic	W 58–50	5–3	Memorial Coliseum; Portland, Oregon
Dec 29, 1962*		vs. Iowa; Far West Classic	W 64–57	6–3	Memorial Coliseum; Portland, Oregon
Jan 4, 1963*		Washington State	W 74–47	7–3	Oregon State Coliseum; Corvallis, Oregon
Jan 5, 1963*		Washington State	W 61–50	8–3	Oregon State Coliseum; Corvallis, Oregon
Jan 11, 1963*		at Stanford	W 65–58	9–3	Old Pavilion; Stanford, California
Jan 12, 1963*		at Stanford	L 69–96	9–4	Old Pavilion; Stanford, California
Jan 19, 1963*	No. 10	Gonzaga	W 63–47	10–4	Oregon State Coliseum; Corvallis, Oregon
Jan 26, 1963*		Washington	W 65–48	11–4	Oregon State Coliseum; Corvallis, Oregon
Feb 1, 1963*		Seattle	W 66–60	12–4	Oregon State Coliseum; Corvallis, Oregon
Feb 8, 1963*		at Portland	L 58–67	12–5	Howard Hall; Portland, Oregon
Feb 9, 1963*		Portland	W 66–51	13–5	Oregon State Coliseum; Corvallis, Oregon
Feb 15, 1963*		Oregon	L 50–54	13–6	Oregon State Coliseum; Corvallis, Oregon
Feb 16, 1963*		at Oregon	W 67–57	14–6	McArthur Court; Eugene, Oregon
Feb 22, 1963*		Southern California	W 76–49	15–6	Oregon State Coliseum; Corvallis, Oregon
Feb 23, 1963*		Southern California	L 58–67	15–7	Oregon State Coliseum; Corvallis, Oregon
Mar 1, 1963*		at Washington State	W 79–56	16–7	Bohler Gymnasium; Pullman, Washington
Mar 2, 1963*		at Washington State	W 74–65	17–7	Bohler Gymnasium; Pullman, Washington
Mar 8, 1963*		at Oregon	W 65–61	18–7	McArthur Court; Eugene, Oregon
Mar 9, 1963*		Oregon	W 71–65	19–7	Oregon State Coliseum; Corvallis, Oregon
NCAA Tournament
Mar 11, 1963*		vs. Seattle; First round	W 70–66	20–7	McArthur Court; Eugene, Oregon
Mar 15, 1963*		vs. San Francisco; Regional semifinal – Sweet Sixteen	W 65–61	21–7	Smith Fieldhouse; Provo, Utah
Mar 16, 1963*		vs. No. 4 Arizona State; Regional final – Elite Eight	W 83–65	22–7	Smith Fieldhouse; Provo, Utah
Mar 22, 1963*		vs. No. 1 Cincinnati; National semifinal – Final Four	L 46–80	22–8	Freedom Hall; Louisville, Kentucky
Mar 23, 1963*		vs. No. 2 Duke; Consolation	L 63–85	22–9	Freedom Hall; Louisville, Kentucky
*Non-conference game. ^{#}Rankings from AP Poll. (#) Tournament seedings in parentheses.

== Awards and honors ==
- Mel Counts – All-American
- Terry Baker – All-American, Academic All-American
