= 1960–61 Idaho Vandals men's basketball team =

American college basketball season

1960–61 Idaho Vandals men's basketball
- Conference: Independent
- Record: 10–16 (.385)
- Head coach: Joe Cipriano (1st season)
- Assistant coach: Wayne Anderson
- MVP: Ken Maren
- Home arena: Memorial Gymnasium

The 1960–61 Idaho Vandals men's basketball team represented the University of Idaho during the 1960–61 NCAA University Division basketball season. The independent Vandals were led by first-year head coach Joe Cipriano and played their home games on campus at the Memorial Gymnasium, in Moscow, Idaho.

In the four years between the demise of the Pacific Coast Conference (1959) and the founding of the Big Sky Conference (1963), Idaho was an independent; this season the Vandals had a 10–16 (.385) record.

Cipriano was hired in May 1960; a former player (and assistant coach) at Washington in Seattle, he was an energetic guard on the Huskies' Final Four team in 1953. He led the Vandals for three years, then departed for Nebraska.

Sophomore Chuck White, a junior college transfer, led the Vandals in scoring at 13.4 points per game; senior co-captain Dale James was next at 12.3 ppg, followed by senior Ken Maren at 11.7 ppg, who led the team with 9.5 rebounds per game.
