= 1961–62 Idaho Vandals men's basketball team =

American college basketball season

1961–62 Idaho Vandals men's basketball
- Conference: Independent
- Record: 13–13 (.500)
- Head coach: Joe Cipriano (2nd season)
- Assistant coach: Wayne Anderson
- MVP: Chuck White
- Home arena: Memorial Gymnasium

The 1961–62 Idaho Vandals men's basketball team represented the University of Idaho during the 1961–62 NCAA University Division basketball season. The independent Vandals were led by second-year head coach Joe Cipriano and played their home games on campus at the Memorial Gymnasium in Moscow, Idaho.

In the four years between the demise of the Pacific Coast Conference (1959) and the founding of the Big Sky Conference (1963), Idaho was an independent; this season the Vandals had a 13–13 (.500) record.

During this season, Vandal great Gus Johnson was a sophomore at Boise Junior College and averaged thirty points and twenty rebounds a game for the Broncos; he transferred to Idaho in 1962 and played the following season.

For the intrastate series with Idaho State, this year marked the introduction of the "King Spud Trophy," an oversized metallic potato with a face and a crown. The first season was an exact split, with the home team winning by two points. Years later in 1979, the Vandals regained it with a home win after enduring seven consecutive losses to ISU; Bengal head coach Lynn Archibald thought it should go to the losing team: "It's the ugliest thing I've ever seen. The only good thing that happened last week was losing it."
