= Jerry Lyne =

American basketball player and coach

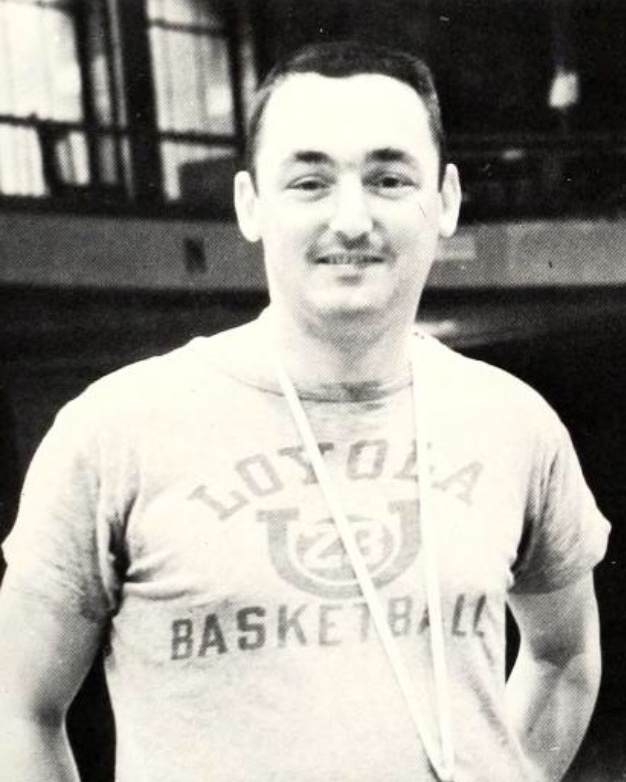
- Lyne from the 1963 Loyolan

Playing career
- 1952–1956: Loyola Chicago

Coaching career (HC unless noted)
- 1962–1974: Loyola Chicago (assistant)
- 1974–1980: Loyola Chicago

Accomplishments and honors

Championships
- As Assistant: NCAA championship (1963)

Jerry Lyne is a South Side Chicagoan, who played for, captained and coached the Loyola Ramblers men's basketball team over the course of several decades that he was affiliated with the Loyola University Chicago.

== Early life ==
Lyne began playing basketball in 5th grade at Little Flower School on the South Side of Chicago, where he eventually became captain. Subsequently, he became captain at Leo Catholic High School and for Loyola. He played for the Loyola for four seasons (1952–56), started for three and captained the team as a senior. While a student at Loyola in the Near North Side community area, he commuted to and from the Auburn Gresham community area on the South Side via the Chicago Transit Authority buses and Chicago 'L'.

== Coaching ==
After serving as an assistant coach for twelve years under George Ireland, Lyne became the interim coach when Ireland retired for health reasons in January 1975. He remained coach until 1980 when third year athletic director Gene Sullivan took over the team.

Lyne became an assistant for the 1962–63 Loyola Ramblers men's basketball team who won the 1963 NCAA Division I men's basketball tournament. During his 12 years as an assistant, he worked at his father's tavern as a porter. He also worked for the last seven summers of his assistantship for the Chicago Park District's basketball program. Under his helm, the 1977–78 Ramblers were victorious at home over Larry Bird's Indiana State Sycamores team, 79–76; Kevin McHale's Minnesota Golden Gophers, 70–66; and the Georgetown Hoyas during John Thompson's first year, 68–65 in overtime. During his final season as coach, the team set the Loyola single-game scoring record with a 133-point performance on November 22, 1979 against Loras College. He concluded his coaching career with a 105–87 loss to Illinois in the 1980 National Invitation Tournament.

Lyne was inducted into the Chicago Sports Hall of Fame in 1989.

== Head coaching record ==
Record table
Season	Coach	Overall	Conference	Standing	Postseason
Loyola Ramblers (Independent) (1974–1979)
1974–75	Loyola	2–9			
1975–76	Loyola	10–16			
1976–77	Loyola	13–13			
1977–78	Loyola	16–11			
1978–79	Loyola	12–15			
Loyola Ramblers (Midwestern City) (1979–1980)
1979–80	Loyola	19–10	5–0	1st	NIT First Round
Jerry Lyne:		72–74 (.493)	5–0 (1.000)		
Total:		72–74 (.493)			
National champion Postseason invitational champion Conference regular season champion Conference regular season and conference tournament champion Division regular season champion Division regular season and conference tournament champion Conference tournament champion
