= The Nail =

The Nail may refer to:

- JLA: The Nail series, a comic book mini-series published by DC Comics
- The Nail: The Story of Joey Nardone, a 2009 drama film
- The Nail (challenge), a standing high jump challenge at the Corner Club tavern in Moscow, Idaho
- The Nail (film), a 1944 Spanish romance drama film

== See also ==
- Nail (disambiguation)
