= 1962–63 Idaho Vandals men's basketball team =

American college basketball season

1962–63 Idaho Vandals men's basketball
- Conference: Independent
- Record: 20–6 (.769)
- Head coach: Joe Cipriano (3rd season)
- Assistant coach: Wayne Anderson
- MVP: Gus Johnson (F/C)
- Captain: Lyle Parks (G)
- Home arena: Memorial Gymnasium

1962–63 NCAA University Division men's basketball independents standings
	Conf.				Overall
Team	W		L	PCT	W		L	PCT
No. 3 Loyola (Ill.)		–		–	29	–	2	.935
Providence		–		–	24	–	4	.857
Miami (FL)		–		–	23	–	5	.821
Colorado State		–		–	18	–	5	.783
Seattle		–		–	21	–	6	.778
Niagara		–		–	14	–	4	.778
Idaho		–		–	20	–	6	.769
Pittsburgh		–		–	19	–	6	.760
Penn State		–		–	15	–	5	.750
Utah State		–		–	20	–	7	.741
Canisius		–		–	19	–	7	.731
Memphis		–		–	19	–	7	.731
Texas Western		–		–	19	–	7	.731
Oregon State		–		–	22	–	9	.710
Seton Hall		–		–	16	–	7	.696
Marquette		–		–	20	–	9	.690
Oklahoma City		–		–	19	–	10	.655
Villanova		–		–	19	–	10	.655
Notre Dame		–		–	17	–	9	.654
DePaul		–		–	15	–	8	.652
Holy Cross		–		–	16	–	9	.640
Iona		–		–	12	–	7	.632
Regis		–		–	15	–	9	.625
Butler		–		–	16	–	10	.615
Dayton		–		–	16	–	10	.615
Florida State		–		–	15	–	10	.600
Duquesne		–		–	13	–	9	.591
Houston		–		–	15	–	11	.577
Louisville		–		–	14	–	11	.560
Detroit		–		–	14	–	12	.538
Gonzaga		–		–	14	–	12	.538
Boston University		–		–	10	–	9	.526
St. Bonaventure		–		–	13	–	12	.520
Creighton		–		–	14	–	13	.519
Georgetown		–		–	13	–	13	.500
Montana State		–		–	13	–	13	.500
Loyola (LA)		–		–	12	–	12	.500
Navy		–		–	9	–	9	.500
Centenary		–		–	12	–	14	.462
Air Force		–		–	10	–	12	.455
Saint Francis (PA)		–		–	10	–	13	.435
Xavier		–		–	12	–	16	.429
Oregon		–		–	11	–	15	.423
Army		–		–	8	–	11	.421
Boston College		–		–	10	–	16	.385
Hardin–Simmons		–		–	10	–	16	.385
Syracuse		–		–	8	–	13	.381
Idaho State		–		–	9	–	15	.375
Portland		–		–	8	–	18	.308
Rutgers		–		–	7	–	16	.304
Colgate		–		–	5	–	13	.278
Montana		–		–	6	–	18	.250
West Texas State		–		–	6	–	18	.250
Denver		–		–	6	–	19	.240
Washington State		–		–	5	–	20	.200
New Mexico State		–		–	4	–	17	.190
Rankings from AP Poll

The 1962–63 Idaho Vandals men's basketball team represented the University of Idaho during the 1962–63 NCAA University Division men's basketball season. The independent Vandals were led by third-year head coach Joe Cipriano, and played their home games on campus at the Memorial Gymnasium, in Moscow, Idaho.

In his only season with the Vandals, forward/center Gus Johnson was a Northwest sensation, and led the team to a 20–6 (.769) record. Under the NCAA rules of the era, junior college transfers that had previously attended a four-year college were not allowed to play in tournaments during their first season at the new (third) school. At the Far West Classic in Portland in late December, Idaho lost two of three games without him. With Johnson on the floor, the team was 19–2 (.905) entering the final weekend, but dropped two in Seattle.

Led by leading scorer Chuck White and Johnson, the Vandals were at their best in their main rivalries from the old Pacific Coast Conference: 4–0 versus Oregon, 4–1 versus Palouse neighbor Washington State, and 1–1 against Washington. The primary nemesis was Seattle University, led by guard Eddie Miles, who swept all three games, half of UI's losses. Idaho dropped its only game with Oregon State at the Far West without Johnson, but won all three with Gonzaga, for a 9–3 record against its four former PCC foes and a collective 12–6 against the six Northwest rivals. In the last season before the Big Sky Conference, the Vandals were undefeated in ten games against those teams; this included a sweep of Idaho State for the King Spud Trophy and unofficial state title.

Attendance at the Memorial Gym was consistently over-capacity, with an estimated 3,800 for home games in the cramped facility. A 94–57 rout of WSU on December 20 caused the region to take notice. The teams met nine days later in Portland without Johnson, and Idaho had to rally from behind to win by a point. Johnson and center Paul Silas of Creighton waged a season-long battle to lead the NCAA in rebounding. Silas claimed this by averaging 20.6 per game, 0.3 more than Johnson. In February, a low-profile article in Sports Illustrated introduced the team to the nation.

Despite their record, the Vandals were not invited to the post-season. The NCAA tournament included only 25 teams and Oregon State and Seattle U. were selected from the Northwest. The NIT invited just twelve teams, with none from the Mountain or Pacific time zones. If Idaho had been invited, Johnson was ineligible to participate.

== Aftermath ==
That spring, 24-year-old Johnson was the tenth overall selection in the 1963 NBA draft and went on to a hall of fame career with the Baltimore Bullets. Cipriano also moved on to coach at Nebraska for seventeen seasons, until his death. Without Johnson (and White), the Vandals fell to 7–19 in 1963–64 and were 4–6 in the new Big Sky Conference, fifth place in the six-team league. They had a dismal 3–14 record through January, and lost every game against their Northwest rivals, a collective 0–10 vs UW, WSU, UO, OSU, Seattle U., and Gonzaga.

High scorer White became a hall of fame high school head coach in Anchorage, Alaska; but both Cipriano and Johnson died before age fifty, due to cancer. Team captain Lyle Parks earned a degree in chemical engineering, and sophomore Chuck Kozak graduated from the UI's law school in 1968.

== Roster ==
1962–63 Idaho Vandals men's basketball team
Players
Coaches

Pos.	#	Name	Height	Weight	Year	Previous school	Hometown
G	10	Don Sowar	6 ft 0 in (1.83 m)	—	So	Coldwater HS	Coldwater, OH
G	11	Lyle Parks (C)	6 ft 1 in (1.85 m)	—	Sr	Kendrick HS	Kendrick, ID
F	13	Jim Schell	6 ft 5 in (1.96 m)	—	Jr	Wendell HS	Wendell, ID
C	14	Wayne Meyer	6 ft 7 in (2.01 m)	—	Jr		Sutter, CA
G	15	Terry Henson	6 ft 1 in (1.85 m)	—	So	Kent-Meridian HS	Kent, WA
G	25	Bill Mattis	6 ft 1 in (1.85 m)	—	Jr	Coeur d'Alene HS	Coeur d'Alene, ID
F	33	Chuck White	6 ft 4 in (1.93 m)	—	Sr	Skagit JC, LW HS	Kirkland, WA
G	35	Fred Crowell	6 ft 2 in (1.88 m)	—	Jr	Anacortes HS	Anacortes, WA
G	42	Rich Porter	6 ft 3 in (1.91 m)	—	Sr	Kellogg HS	Kellogg, ID
C	43	Gus Johnson	6 ft 6 in (1.98 m)	220 lb (100 kg)	RS Jr	Boise JC, Akron	Akron, OH
F	44	Tom Whitfield	6 ft 5 in (1.96 m)	—	Jr	Garfield HS	Seattle, WA
C	45	Tom Moreland	6 ft 7 in (2.01 m)	—	So	Coeur d'Alene HS	Coeur d'Alene, ID
F	51	Nelson Levias	6 ft 2 in (1.88 m)	—	So	Garfield HS	Seattle, WA
F	55	Chuck Kozak	6 ft 4 in (1.93 m)	—	So		Seattle, WA

Head coach

- Joe Cipriano (Washington)

Assistant coach(es)

- Wayne Anderson (Idaho)

Legend

- (C) Team captain
- (S) Suspended
- (I) Ineligible
- (W) Walk-on
- Injured
- Current redshirt

Roster

== Schedule and results ==
Date time, TV	Opponent	Result	Record	Site (attendance) city, state
Mon, Dec 3; 8:00 pm	Long Beach State	W 85–68	1–0	Memorial Gymnasium (3,800); Moscow, Idaho
Fri, Dec 7; 8:15 pm	at Gonzaga; Rivalry	W 63–52	2–0	Spokane Coliseum (6,644); Spokane, Washington
Fri, Dec 14; 7:00 pm	at Montana State	W 68–61	3–0	Brick Breeden Fieldhouse (2,000); Bozeman, Montana
Sat, Dec 15; 7:00 pm	at Montana State	W 64–63 ^{OT}	4–0	Brick Breeden Fieldhouse (3,500); Bozeman, Montana
Thu, Dec 20; 8:00 pm	Washington State; Battle of the Palouse	W 94–57	5–0	Memorial Gymnasium (3,800); Moscow, Idaho
Thu, Dec 27; 9:30 pm	vs. Oregon State; Far West Classic	L 53–80	5–1	Memorial Coliseum (12,129); Portland, Oregon
Fri, Dec 28; 4:00 pm	vs. Seattle; Far West Classic	L 71–85	5–2	Memorial Coliseum (2,140); Portland, Oregon
Sat, Dec 29; 2:00 pm	vs. Washington State; Far West Classic; Battle of the Palouse	W 64–63	6–2	Memorial Coliseum (1,500); Portland, Oregon
Sat, Jan 5; 7:00 pm	at Montana	W 75–60	7–2	Adams Fieldhouse (4,000); Missoula, Montana
Tue, Jan 8; 8:00 pm	at Washington State; Battle of the Palouse	W 75–67	8–2	Bohler Gymnasium (4,000); Pullman, Washington
Fri, Jan 11; 8:00 pm	at Oregon	W 62–61 ^{OT}	9–2	McArthur Court (3,388); Eugene, Oregon
Sat, Jan 12; 8:00 pm	at Oregon	W 81–58	10–2	McArthur Court (3,549); Eugene, Oregon
Tue, Jan 15; 8:00 pm	Washington State; Battle of the Palouse	W 72–65	11–2	Memorial Gymnasium (3,750); Moscow, Idaho
Tue, Jan 22; 8:00 pm	Montana	W 78–69	12–2	Memorial Gymnasium (3,700); Moscow, Idaho
Fri, Feb 1; 8:00 pm	at Washington State; Battle of the Palouse	L 57–66	12–3	Bohler Gymnasium (3,500); Pullman, Washington
Sat, Feb 2; 8:00 pm	Idaho State; King Spud Trophy	W 90–61	13–3	Memorial Gymnasium (3,800); Moscow, Idaho
Fri, Feb 8; 8:00 pm	Oregon	W 79–61	14–3	Memorial Gymnasium (3,800); Moscow, Idaho
Sat, Feb 9; 8:00 pm	Oregon	W 88–78	15–3	Memorial Gymnasium (3,800); Moscow, Idaho
Fri, Feb 15; 7:30 pm	at Idaho State; King Spud Trophy	W 83–76	16–3	Reed Gymnasium (4,900); Pocatello, Idaho
Sat, Feb 16; 8:00 pm	vs. Gonzaga; Rivalry	W 83–76	17–3	(3,600); Twin Falls, Idaho
Fri, Feb 22; 8:00 pm	Seattle	L 72–77	17–4	Memorial Gymnasium (3,800); Moscow, Idaho
Sat, Feb 23; 8:00 pm	Washington	W 63–56	18–4	Memorial Gymnasium (3,800); Moscow, Idaho
Fri, Mar 1; 8:00 pm	Gonzaga; Rivalry	W 87–81	19–4	Memorial Gymnasium (3,800); Moscow, Idaho
Sat, Mar 2; 8:00 pm	Montana State	W 106–79	20–4	Memorial Gymnasium (3,800); Moscow, Idaho
Fri, Mar 8; 8:00 pm	at Washington	L 50–58	20–5	Hec Edmundson Pavilion (7,000); Seattle, Washington
Sat, Mar 9; 8:00 pm	at Seattle	L 88–95	20–6	Seattle Center Coliseum (6,126); Seattle, Washington
*Non-conference game. ^{#}Rankings from AP Poll. (#) Tournament seedings in parentheses. All times are in Pacific Time.
