= Joe Cipriano (basketball) =

American college basketball coach

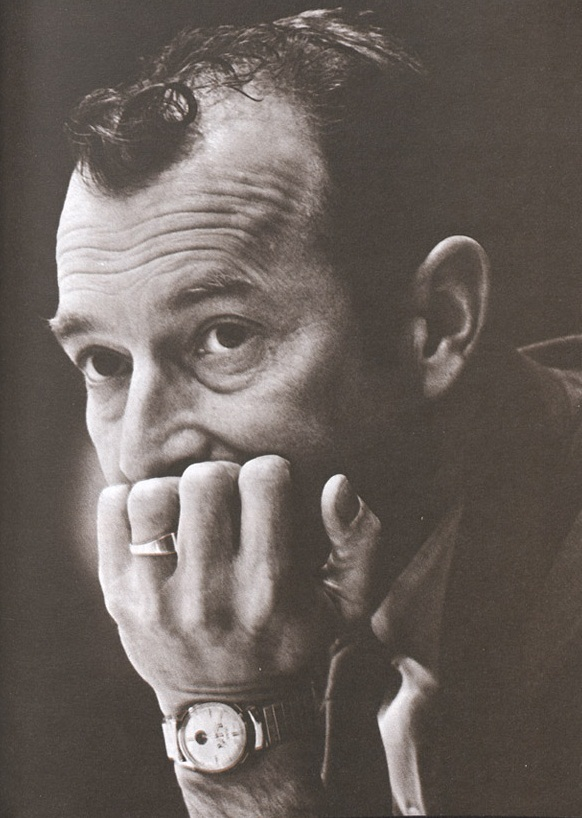
- Cipriano, circa 1970

Biographical details
- Born: October 27, 1931; Sumas, Washington, U.S.
- Died: November 25, 1980 (aged 49); Lincoln, Nebraska, U.S.

Playing career
- 1950–1953: Washington
- Position: Guard

Coaching career (HC unless noted)
- 1953–1960: Washington (assistant)
- 1960–1963: Idaho
- 1963–1980: Nebraska

Head coaching record
- Overall: 297–231
- Tournaments: 1–3 (NIT)

Accomplishments and honors

Awards
- First-team All-PCC (1953)

Joe Cipriano (October 27, 1931 – November 25, 1980) was an American college basketball coach, the head coach at independent Idaho (1960–63) and Nebraska (1963–80) of the Big Eight Conference.

== Playing career ==
Born in Sumas in northwest Washington, he was an all-state guard known as "Slippery Joe" at Nooksack Valley High School in Whatcom County and graduated in 1949. "Jumping Joe" was an All-PCC guard in college under coach Tippy Dye at Washington in Seattle, and led the Huskies to a 79–15 (.840) record in his three years on the varsity. In his senior season, the energetic Cipriano and the Huskies advanced to the Final Four in March 1953 in Kansas City and finished third.

== Assistant coach ==
After graduation, he was the freshman coach at Washington and later an assistant coach under Dye and Johnny Grayson.

== Head coach ==
=== Idaho ===
At age 28, Cipriano became the head coach at the University of Idaho in May 1960. He succeeded Dave Strack, who left after a single season in Moscow to return to Michigan as the head coach. Cipriano's Vandal teams improved each year as an independent and went 43–35 (.551) in three seasons.

His most notable player was future NBA star Gus Johnson, the tenth overall selection in the 1963 NBA draft and a future hall of famer. After the successful 20–6 (.769) season in 1962–63, Johnson turned professional and Cipriano moved east to Nebraska. The following season, the Vandals were fifth in the new six-team Big Sky Conference (4–6, 7–19 overall).

=== Nebraska ===
In March 1963, Cipriano became the head coach at the University of Nebraska in Lincoln, hired by his former mentor, Tippy Dye, who became the NU athletic director a year earlier (and hired head football coach Bob Devaney). Cipriano ran the Big Eight basketball program for over 17 years, until he lost his 18-month battle with pancreatic cancer in Lincoln in November 1980 at age 49. He compiled a record of 254–196 (.564) with the Huskers.

At the time of his retirement, he was far and away the winningest basketball coach in Nebraska history, with 168 more wins than any previous head coach, and one-fifth of the Cornhuskers' all-time wins in 83 years of play. He led the Huskers to the National Invitation Tournament (NIT) in 1967, the first postseason appearance in school history, with additional invites in 1978 and 1980. In his third year at Lincoln, the 1965–66 Huskers tallied the program's first 20-win season, runner-up to fourth-ranked Kansas (13–1) in the Big Eight at 12–2, handing the Jayhawks their sole conference loss, but did not garner a postseason bid. During this era, only the conference champion was guaranteed a berth in the 22-team NCAA tournament, and the NIT invited only fourteen.

Less than a year before his death, Cipriano returned to Moscow when his Huskers took on Don Monson's Vandals in the Kibbie Dome in early January. The two head coaches had played against each other 27 years earlier, as guards in the Pacific Coast Conference. Though it was played before classes resumed, it was the second-highest attendance for a basketball game to date on campus, in the Dome's fifth season.

Cipriano spent his final week at Bryan Memorial Hospital in Lincoln, and is buried at Lincoln Memorial Park in Lincoln.

== Head coaching record ==
Record table
Season	Team	Overall	Conference	Standing	Postseason
Idaho Vandals (NCAA University Division independent) (1960–1963)
1960–61	Idaho	10–16			
1961–62	Idaho	13–13			
1962–63	Idaho	20–6			
Idaho:		43–35 (.551)			
Nebraska Cornhuskers (Big Eight Conference) (1963–1980)
1963–64	Nebraska	7–18	5–9	T–6th	
1964–65	Nebraska	10–15	5–9	T–6th	
1965–66	Nebraska	20–5	12–2	2nd	
1966–67	Nebraska	16–9	10–4	T–2nd	NIT Quarterfinal
1967–68	Nebraska	15–10	8–6	T–3rd	
1968–69	Nebraska	12–14	5–9	T–6th	
1969–70	Nebraska	16–9	7–7	T–3rd	
1970–71	Nebraska	18–8	8–6	4th	
1971–72	Nebraska	14–12	7–7	4th	
1972–73	Nebraska	9–17	4–10	T–6th	
1973–74	Nebraska	14–12	7–7	4th	
1974–75	Nebraska	14–12	7–7	4th	
1975–76	Nebraska	19–8	10–4	3rd	
1976–77	Nebraska	16–13	7–7	5th	
1977–78	Nebraska	22–8	9–5	2nd	NIT Quarterfinal
1978–79	Nebraska	14–13	7–7	5th	
1979–80	Nebraska	18–13	8–6	T–2nd	NIT First Round
Nebraska:		254–196 (.564)	126–112 (.529)		
Total:		297–231 (.563)			
National champion Postseason invitational champion Conference regular season champion Conference regular season and conference tournament champion Division regular season champion Division regular season and conference tournament champion Conference tournament champion
