= The Nail (challenge) =

Standing high jump challenge

Coordinates: 46.7347°N 117.0012°W

Location in the United States
Location in Idaho

The Nail is a standing high jump challenge associated with the Corner Club, a sports bar in the northwest United States, on the Palouse in Moscow, Idaho. Contestants who can jump from a standing spot to touch The Nail win free drinks. The challenge originated 63 years ago in 1963 with Gus Johnson, a power forward on the University of Idaho Vandals basketball team and a member of the Naismith Basketball Hall of Fame.

While Johnson was at Idaho during the 1962–63 season, he earned a reputation as an excellent jumper. On one evening at the Corner Club, a popular tavern on north Main Street in Moscow, owner Herm Goetz challenged Johnson to demonstrate his jumping ability. "The Club" was a modest establishment with minimal furnishings, converted to a bar in 1948 from a small white stucco chapel with hardwood floors and substantial beams on its ceiling. From a standing start near the front bar, Johnson leapt to touch a spot on a beam 11 ft 6 in (3.51 m) above the floor level. The spot on the beam was marked with a ceremonial nail by Goetz, who offered free drinks to anyone who could touch it. A 40-inch (1 m) diameter circle was painted on the floor below that beam, and any contestant had to start standing still inside the circle.

Many challengers have attempted to touch The Nail, including the 6 ft 11 in (2.11 m) Bill Walton in the summer of 1984. Walton, then a pro at age 31, could not touch The Nail, blaming "too much pizza and beer tonight".

In late January 1986, the team bus of College of Southern Idaho, a junior college in Twin Falls, stopped in Moscow en route to a game against North Idaho College in Coeur d'Alene. Joey Johnson, a 6 ft 3 in (1.91 m) guard with a 48-inch (1.22 m) vertical leap, was invited to try the challenge. Johnson touched The Nail on his first try, but this attempt was disqualified because he did not start with both feet inside the circle. His next attempt came from a legal standing start, but was slightly short. On his third try, Johnson leaped, grabbed the nail, and bent it. Goetz next pulled The Nail out of its beam, and he pounded it back in, half an inch (1 cm) higher. Joey Johnson later played at Arizona State University in Tempe.

Following Gus Johnson's death from inoperable brain cancer in 1987, flowers were found hanging from The Nail.

Due to road reconstruction on north Main Street (the widening and straightening of the couplet for US-95 north), the entire original (west) portion of the Corner Club was demolished in January 1991. The original location of "The Nail" was condemned. The back (east) addition, built in 1981 of cinder blocks, was left standing. The Corner Club had been targeted for removal for the traffic revision since the late 1970s.

Today, the Corner Club marks the spot of The Nail with a brick over the entrance. “If someone wanted to try it, and if they could touch it, sure, I’d buy them a couple of drinks,” said co-owner Marc Trivelpiece.

The elevation at street level is approximately 2,570 feet (785 m) above sea level.
