= 1962–63 UCLA Bruins men's basketball team =

American college basketball season

1962–63 UCLA Bruins men's basketball
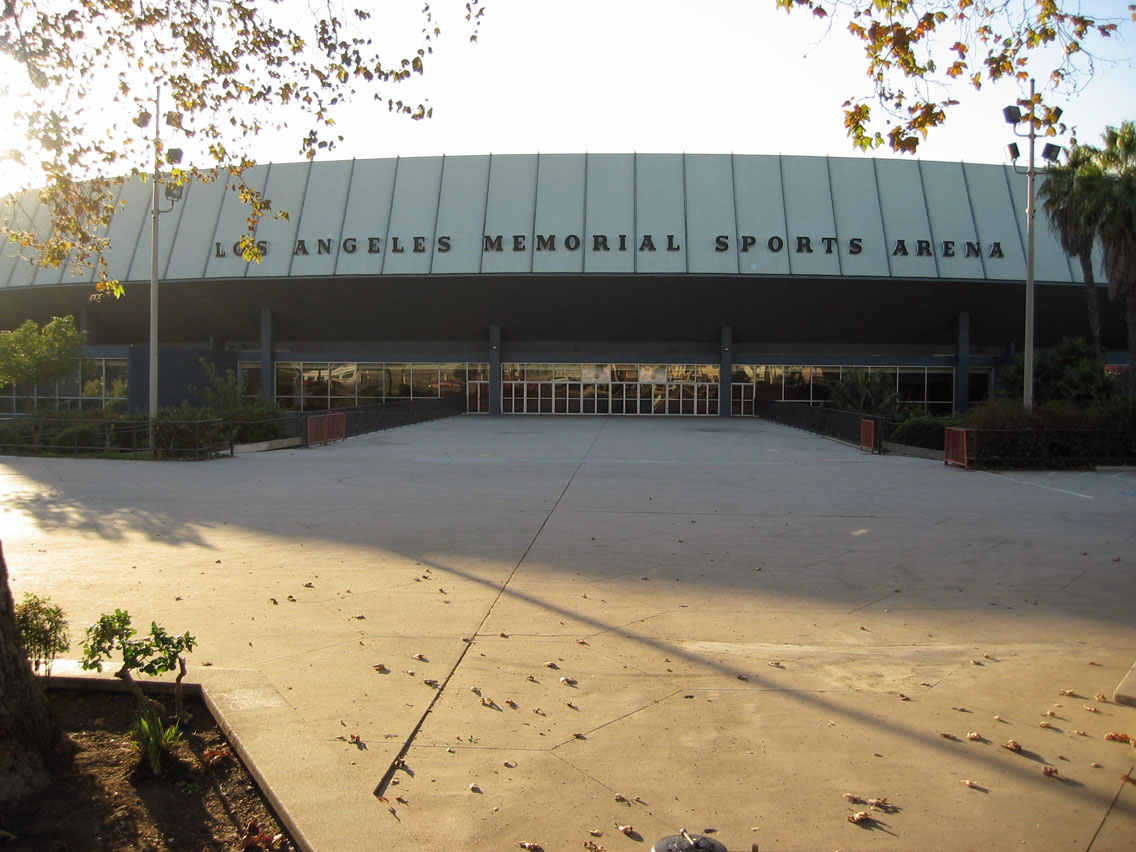

Los Angeles Classic champions

NCAA tournament, West Region semifinals
- Conference: Athletic Association of Western Universities

Ranking
- Coaches: No. 15
- Record: 20–9 (8–5 (T-1st) Big Six)
- Head coach: John R. Wooden
- Assistant coach: Jerry Norman
- Home arena: Los Angeles Memorial Sports Arena; Los Angeles, California

1962–63 AAWU Conference men's basketball standings
	Conf.				Overall
Team	W		L	PCT	W		L	PCT
UCLA †	7	–	5	.583	20	–	9	.690
Stanford	7	–	5	.583	16	–	9	.640
USC	6	–	6	.500	20	–	9	.690
Washington	6	–	6	.500	13	–	13	.500
California	4	–	8	.333	13	–	11	.542
† Conference playoff game winner Rankings from AP Poll

The 1962–63 UCLA Bruins men's basketball team was coached by John Wooden in his 15th year. The Bruins tied for first in the AAWU (7–5) and defeated Stanford in a one-game playoff for the berth in the NCAA tournament. They lost in their opener to Arizona State (93–79) but won ten national championships in the next twelve years.

== Roster ==
1962–63 UCLA Bruins men's basketball team
Players
Coaches

Pos.	#	Name	Height	Weight	Year	Hometown
F	53	Keith Erickson	6 ft 5 in (1.96 m)	195 lb (88 kg)	So	San Francisco, California
G	25	Gail Goodrich	6 ft 1 in (1.85 m)	170 lb (77 kg)	So	Los Angeles, California
G	22	Larry Gower	5 ft 11 in (1.8 m)	—
G	44	Freddie Goss	6 ft 1 in (1.85 m)	—
G	42	Walt Hazzard	6 ft 2 in (1.88 m)	185 lb (84 kg)	Jr	Wilmington, Delaware
F	50	Jack Hirsch	6 ft 3 in (1.91 m)	—	Jr	Brooklyn, New York
G	20	Mike Huggins	5 ft 11 in (1.8 m)	—
F	52	Rich Levin	6 ft 4 in (1.93 m)	—
G	44	Jim Milhorn (C)	5 ft 10 in (1.78 m)	—
C	35	Fred Slaughter	6 ft 5 in (1.96 m)	—	Jr
C	34	Kim Stewart	6 ft 4 in (1.93 m)	—
F	32	Dave Waxman	6 ft 6 in (1.98 m)	—

Head coach

John Wooden (Purdue)

Assistant coach(es)

Legend

- (C) Team captain
- (S) Suspended
- (I) Ineligible
- (W) Walk-on
- Injured
- Current redshirt

Roster
Last update: 27 October 2017

== Schedule ==
Date time, TV	Rank^{#}	Opponent^{#}	Result	Record	Site city, state
Regular Season
November 30, 1962*		Denver	W 70–41	1–0	Los Angeles Memorial Sports Arena; Los Angeles, CA
December 1, 1962*		Santa Clara	W 66–41	2–0	Men's Gym; Los Angeles, CA
December 7, 1962*		at Colorado	L 60–82	2–1	Balch Fieldhouse; Boulder, CO
December 8, 1962*		at Colorado State	L 65–66	2–2	South College Gymnasium; Fort Collins, CO
December 14, 1962*		Oklahoma	W 101–64	3–2	Santa Monica City College; Santa Monica, CA
December 15, 1962*		Missouri	W 72–55	4–2	Santa Monica City College; Santa Monica, CA
December 18, 1962*		at Butler	W 81–68	5–2	Butler Fieldhouse; Indianapolis, IN
December 20, 1962*		at Northwestern	W 70–63	6–2	McGaw Memorial Hall; Evanston, IL
December 22, 1962*		at Wisconsin	W 77–63	7–2	Wisconsin Field House; Madison, WI
December 26, 1962*		Utah State; Los Angeles Classic	W 89–75	8–2	Los Angeles Memorial Sports Arena; Los Angeles, CA
December 28, 1962*		Saint Louis; Los Angeles Classic	W 85–66	9–2	Los Angeles Memorial Sports Arena; Los Angeles, CA
December 29, 1962*		Colorado State; Los Angeles Classic	W 68–64	10–2	Los Angeles Memorial Sports Arena; Los Angeles, CA
January 1, 1962	No. 9	Washington	L 61–62	10–3 (0–1)	Hec Edmundson Pavilion; Seattle, WA
January 5, 1962	No. 9	Washington	L 63–67	10–4 (0–2)	Hec Edmundson Pavilion; Seattle, WA
January 12, 1962		California	W 63–58	11–4 (1–2)	Santa Monica City College; Santa Monica, CA
January 25, 1962*		at Texas Tech	W 83–63	12–4	Lubbock Municipal Coliseum; Lubbock, TX
January 26, 1962*		at Texas Tech	W 103–80	13–4	Lubbock Municipal Coliseum; Lubbock, TX
February 1, 1962		USC	W 77–65	14–4 (2–2)	Los Angeles Memorial Sports Arena; Los Angeles, CA
February 2, 1962		USC	W 86–72	15–4 (3–2)	Los Angeles Memorial Sports Arena; Los Angeles, CA
February 9, 1962		at No. 10 Stanford	L 78–86	15–5 (3–3)	Stanford Pavilion; Stanford, CA
February 22, 1962		at Stanford	L 69–73	15–6 (3–4)	Stanford Pavilion; Stanford, CA
February 23, 1962		California	W 64–57	16–6 (4–4)	Harmon Gym; Berkeley, CA
March 1, 1962		USC	L 60–62	16–7 (4–5)	Los Angeles Memorial Sports Arena; Los Angeles, CA
March 2, 1962		Washington	W 80–52	17–7 (5–5)	Santa Monica City College; Santa Monica, CA
March 8, 1962		No. 9 Stanford	W 64–54	18–7 (6–5)	Santa Monica City College; Santa Monica, CA
March 9, 1962		California	W 72–53	19–7 (7–5)	Santa Monica City College; Santa Monica, CA
AAWU Playoff
March 13, 1962		vs. Stanford; Playoff	W 51–45	20–7	Santa Monica City College; Santa Monica, CA
NCAA Tournament
March 15, 1963*		vs. No. 4 Arizona State; Regional semifinal	L 79–93	20–8	Smith Fieldhouse; Provo, UT
March 16, 1963*		vs. San Francisco; Regional third-place game	L 75–76	20–9	Smith Fieldhouse; Provo, UT
*Non-conference game. ^{#}Rankings from AP Poll. (#) Tournament seedings in parentheses. All times are in Pacific time.
