= 1962–63 Washington State Cougars men's basketball team =

American college basketball season

1962–63 Washington State Cougars men's basketball
- Conference: Athletic Association of Western Universities
- Record: 5–20 ( AAWU)
- Head coach: Marv Harshman (5th season)
- Home arena: Bohler Gymnasium

1962–63 AAWU Conference men's basketball standings
	Conf.				Overall
Team	W		L	PCT	W		L	PCT
UCLA †	7	–	5	.583	20	–	9	.690
Stanford	7	–	5	.583	16	–	9	.640
USC	6	–	6	.500	20	–	9	.690
Washington	6	–	6	.500	13	–	13	.500
California	4	–	8	.333	13	–	11	.542
† Conference playoff game winner Rankings from AP Poll

The 1962–63 Washington State Cougars men's basketball team represented Washington State University for the 1962–63 NCAA college basketball season. Led by fifth-year head coach Marv Harshman, the Cougars were new members of the Athletic Association of Western Universities (AAWU, Big Six) and played their home games on campus at Bohler Gymnasium in Pullman, Washington.

The Cougars were 5–20 overall in the regular season, and dropped both games to rival Washington.

Because they were approved for AAWU membership in June 1962 and formally joined a few weeks later, the schedules for this season were already in place. Washington State did not play any of the four AAWU members from California, so they were effectively an independent for a fourth consecutive year. A full league schedule began the following season.

It was a difficult year, as the Cougars were 1–15 against former Northern Division members of the Pacific Coast Conference: Washington (0–2), Oregon (0–5), Oregon State (0–4), and Palouse neighbor Idaho (1–4).
