= 1962–63 NCAA University Division men's basketball rankings =

- Season: 1962–63
- NCAA Tournament: 1963
- Preseason No. 1: Cincinnati
- NCAA Tournament Champions: Loyola-Chicago
NCAA University Division men's basketball rankings


The 1962–63 NCAA men's basketball rankings was made up of two human polls, the AP Poll and the Coaches Poll.

== Legend ==
	Increase in ranking
	Decrease in ranking
	New to rankings from previous week
Italics	Number of first place votes
(#–#)	Win–loss record
т	Tied with team above or below also with this symbol

== AP Poll ==
All AP polls for this season included only ten ranked teams.

	Preseason	Week 2 Dec. 4	Week 3 Dec. 11	Week 4 Dec. 18	Week 5 Dec. 25	Week 6 Jan. 1	Week 7 Jan. 8	Week 8 Jan. 15	Week 9 Jan. 22	Week 10 Jan. 29	Week 11 Feb. 5	Week 12 Feb. 12	Week 13 Feb. 19	Week 14 Feb. 26	Week 15 Mar. 5	Final Mar. 12	
1.	Cincinnati	Cincinnati (1–0)	Cincinnati (4–0)	Cincinnati (6–0)	Cincinnati (8–0)	Cincinnati (9–0)	Cincinnati (11–0)	Cincinnati (13–0)	Cincinnati (14–0)	Cincinnati (15–0) (42)	Cincinnati (17–0)	Cincinnati (19–0)	Cincinnati (19–1)	Cincinnati (21–1)	Cincinnati (23–1)	Cincinnati (23–1)	1.
2.	Duke	Duke (1–0)	Duke (3–0)	Duke (6–0)	Ohio State (6–0)	Loyola-Chicago (11–0)	Loyola-Chicago (13–0)	Loyola-Chicago (15–0)	Loyola-Chicago (16–0)	Loyola-Chicago (18–0)	Loyola-Chicago (20–0)	Loyola-Chicago (20–0)	Duke (19–2)	Duke (21–2)	Duke (24–2)	Duke (24–2)	2.
3.	Kentucky	West Virginia (1–0)	Ohio State (4–0)	Ohio State (5–0)	Loyola-Chicago (7–0)	Illinois (8–1)	Arizona State (12–1)	Illinois (11–1)	Illinois (12–1)	Duke (13–2) (1)	Duke (15–2)	Duke (17–2)	Loyola-Chicago (21–1)	Loyola-Chicago (23–1)	Ohio State (19–3)	Loyola-Chicago (24–2)	3.
4.	Loyola-Chicago	Loyola-Chicago (1–0)	Loyola-Chicago (2–0)	Loyola-Chicago (4–0)	Illinois (5–0)	Arizona State (10–1)	Ohio State (9–1)	Arizona State (14–1)	Duke (12–2)	Illinois (12–2)	Illinois (12–2)	Illinois (14–2)	Arizona State (20–2)	Arizona State (22–2)	Arizona State (23–2)	Arizona State (24–2)	4.
5.	West Virginia	Mississippi State (0–0)	Mississippi State (3–0)	Mississippi State (5–0)	Kentucky (5–2)	Ohio State (8–1)	Illinois (9–1)	Duke (12–2)	Arizona State (15–2)	Arizona State (15–2)	Arizona State (16–2)	Arizona State (18–2)	Ohio State (15–3)	Ohio State (17–3)	Loyola-Chicago (24–2)	Wichita (19–7)	5.
6.	Mississippi State	Wisconsin (1–0)	West Virginia (2–1)	Colorado (4–0)	Arizona State (7–1)	Kentucky (7–3)	Duke (10–2)	Georgia Tech (11–1)	West Virginia (12–3)	Georgia Tech (14–1)	Georgia Tech (16–1)	Mississippi State (16–4)	Illinois (14–4)	Illinois (16–4)	Wichita (19–7)	Mississippi State (21–5)	6.
7.	Oregon State	Oregon State (0–0)	Wisconsin (2–1)	West Virginia (3–1)	USC (9–0)	Duke (8–2)	Georgia Tech (9–0)	Wichita (11–3)	Georgia Tech (12–1)	Stanford (12–3)	Colorado (12–3)	Colorado (13–4)	Wichita (16–6)	Mississippi State (19–5)	Mississippi State (21–5)	Ohio State (20–4)	7.
8.	Illinois	Indiana (1–0)	Colorado (3–0)	Illinois (3–0)	Duke (6–2)	Wichita (9–2)	Wichita (9–3)	Ohio State (10–2)	Wichita (12–4)	Colorado (11–3)	Mississippi State (14–4)	Stanford (13–5)	Mississippi State (17–5)	Wichita (16–7)	Illinois (17–5)	Illinois (19–5)	8.
9.	St. Bonaventure	Kentucky (0–1)	Oregon State (1–1)	Kentucky (3–1)	Stanford (7–0)	UCLA (10–2)	West Virginia (8–3)	Mississippi State (10–3)	Mississippi State (12–3)	Mississippi State (12–4)	Wichita (14–5)	Ohio State (14–3)	Auburn (16–2)	NYU (15–2)	Stanford (18–6)	NYU (17–3)	9.
10.	Wisconsin	Wichita (1–0)	Illinois (2–0)	Seattle (4–0)	Mississippi State (6–1)	Auburn (8–0)	North Carolina (6–1)	Oregon State (9–4)	Stanford (12–3)	Wichita (13–5)	Stanford (12–4)	Georgia Tech (17–3)	NYU (13–2)	Georgia Tech (20–4)	Providence (19–4)	Colorado (17–6)	10.
	Preseason	Week 2 Dec. 4	Week 3 Dec. 11	Week 4 Dec. 18	Week 5 Dec. 25	Week 6 Jan. 1	Week 7 Jan. 8	Week 8 Jan. 15	Week 9 Jan. 22	Week 10 Jan. 29	Week 11 Feb. 5	Week 12 Feb. 12	Week 13 Feb. 19	Week 14 Feb. 26	Week 15 Mar. 5	Final Mar. 12	
		Dropped: Illinois (1–0); St. Bonaventure	Dropped: Indiana (1–3); Kentucky (1–1); Wichita	Dropped: Wisconsin (3–2); Oregon State (2–2)	Dropped: Colorado (5–2); West Virginia (4–2); Seattle (5–1)	Dropped: USC; Stanford (9–2); Mississippi State (7–2)	Dropped: Kentucky (7–4); UCLA (10–4); Auburn (8–1)	Dropped: West Virginia (10–3); North Carolina	Dropped: Ohio State (10–3); Oregon State (10–4)	Dropped: West Virginia (12–4)	None	Dropped: Wichita (14–6)	Dropped: Colorado (14–5); Stanford (14–6); Georgia Tech (18–4)	Dropped: Auburn (17–3)	Dropped: NYU (15–3)	Dropped: Stanford (18–6); Providence (21–4)	

== UPI Poll ==
	Preseason	Week 2 Dec. 4	Week 3 Dec. 11	Week 4 Dec. 18	Week 5 Dec. 25	Week 6 Jan. 1	Week 7 Jan. 8	Week 8 Jan. 15	Week 9 Jan. 22	Week 10 Jan. 29	Week 11 Feb. 5	Week 12 Feb. 12	Week 13 Feb. 19	Week 14 Feb. 26	Week 15 Mar. 5	Final Mar. 12	
1.	Cincinnati	Cincinnati (1–0)	Cincinnati (4–0)	Cincinnati (6–0)	Cincinnati (8–0)	Cincinnati (9–0)	Cincinnati (11–0)	Cincinnati (13–0)	Cincinnati (14–0)	Cincinnati (15–0)	Cincinnati (17–0)	Cincinnati (19–0)	Cincinnati (19–1)	Cincinnati (21–1)	Cincinnati (23–1)	Cincinnati (23–1)	1.
2.	Duke	Duke (1–0)	Duke (3–0)	Duke (6–0)	Loyola-Chicago (7–0)	Loyola-Chicago (11–0)	Loyola-Chicago (13–0)	Loyola-Chicago (15–0)	Loyola-Chicago (16–0)	Loyola-Chicago (18–0)	Loyola-Chicago (20–0)	Loyola-Chicago (20–0)	Duke (19–2)	Duke (21–2)	Duke (24–2)	Duke (24–2)	2.
3.	Kentucky	Loyola-Chicago (1–0)	Loyola-Chicago (2–0)	Loyola-Chicago (4–0)	Ohio State (6–0)	Illinois (8–1)	Illinois (9–1)	Illinois (11–1)	Illinois (12–1)	Duke (13–2)	Duke (15–2)	Duke (17–2)	Loyola-Chicago (21–1)	Loyola-Chicago (23–1)	Arizona State (23–2)	Arizona State (24–2)	3.
4.	West Virginia	West Virginia (1–0)	Ohio State (4–0)	Ohio State (5–0)	Stanford (7–0)	Arizona State (10–1)	Arizona State (12–1)	Arizona State (14–1)	Duke (12–2)	Illinois (12–2)	Illinois (12–2)	Illinois (14–2)	Arizona State (20–2)	Arizona State (22–2)	Ohio State (19–3)	Loyola-Chicago (24–2)	4.
5.	Loyola-Chicago	Oregon State (0–0)	Mississippi State (3–0)	Mississippi State (5–0)	Illinois (5–0)	UCLA (10–2)	Ohio State (9–1)	Duke (12–2)	Arizona State (15–2)	Arizona State (15–2)	Arizona State (16–2)	Arizona State (18–2)	Illinois (14–4)	Illinois (16–4)	Loyola-Chicago (24–2)	Illinois (19–5)	5.
6.	Oregon State	Mississippi State (0–0)	Oregon State (1–1)	Bowling Green (4–0)	Arizona State (7–1)	Ohio State (8–1)	Duke (10–2)	Georgia Tech (11–1)	Georgia Tech (12–1)	Georgia Tech (14–1)	Georgia Tech (16–1)	Colorado (13–4)	Wichita (16–6)	Ohio State (17–3)	Wichita (19–7)	Wichita (19–7)	6.
7.	Mississippi State	Illinois (1–0)	Stanford (2–0)	Illinois (3–0)	Bowling Green (4–0)	Kentucky (7–3)	Georgia Tech (9–0)	Wichita (11–3)	Mississippi State (12–3)	Stanford (12–3)	Colorado (12–3)	Mississippi State (16–4)	Ohio State (15–3) т	Mississippi State (19–5)	Mississippi State (21–5)	Mississippi State (21–5)	7.
8.	St. Bonaventure	Wisconsin (1–0)	Illinois (2–0)	Stanford (3–0)	Kentucky (5–2)	Wichita (9–2)	Mississippi State (9–2)	Ohio State (10–2)	Wichita (12–4)	Colorado (11–3)	Stanford (12–4)	Stanford (13–5)	Stanford (14–6) т	Stanford (15–6)	Illinois (17–5)	Ohio State (20–4)	8.
9.	Wisconsin	Kansas State (1–0)	Bowling Green (1–0)	Arizona State (5–0)	Mississippi State (6–1)	Duke (8–2)	Wichita (9–3)	Mississippi State (10–3)	Stanford (12–3)	Oregon State (11–4)	Mississippi State (14–4)	Georgia Tech (17–3)	Colorado (14–5)	Wichita (16–7)	Stanford (18–6)	Colorado (17–6)	9.
10.	Bowling Green т	Bowling Green (1–0)	West Virginia (2–1)	West Virginia (3–1)	Duke (6–2)	Oregon State (6–3)	UCLA (10–4)	Oregon State (9–4)	West Virginia (12–3)	Wichita (13–5)	Oregon State (12–4)	Oregon State (13–5)	Georgia Tech (18–4)	NYU (15–2)	NYU (15–3)	Stanford (18–6)	10.
11.	Stanford т	Stanford (2–0)	Colorado (3–0)	Colorado (4–0)	UCLA (7–2)	Mississippi State (7–2)	Oregon State (8–3)	Colorado State (9–3)	Colorado (11–3)	Mississippi State (12–4)	Wichita (14–5)	Utah State (17–3)	Mississippi State (17–5)	Texas (16–5)	Texas (18–5)	NYU (17–3)	11.
12.	Dayton	Creighton (1–0) т	Wisconsin (2–1)	Kentucky (3–1)	West Virginia (4–2)	Auburn (8–0)	North Carolina (6–1)	Colorado (10–3)	Oregon State (10–4)	UCLA (13–4)	Utah State (17–3)	Ohio State (14–3)	NYU (13–2)	Georgia Tech (18–4)	Colorado State (18–4)	Texas (19–6)	12.
13.	Illinois	UCLA (2–0) т	Arizona State (3–0)	Oregon State (2–2)	Seattle (5–1)	Georgia Tech (7–0)	West Virginia (8–3) т	UCLA (11–4)	Ohio State (10–3)	Utah State (15–3)	UCLA (13–4)	Texas (12–5)	Oregon State (14–6)	Colorado (15–6)	Providence (19–4) т	Providence (21–4)	13.
14.	Kansas State	Kentucky (0–1)	Drake (3–0)	Seattle (4–0)	Virginia Tech (4–1)	North Carolina (4–1)	Colorado State (9–3) т	West Virginia (10–3) т	UCLA (11–4)	Ohio State (11–4)	Ohio State (12–4)	UCLA (13–5)	Texas (14–5)	Colorado State (17–4)	Kansas State (15–8) т	Oregon State (19–7)	14.
15.	Arizona State	NYU (1–0)	Kentucky (1–1)	Minnesota (3–1)	USC (9–0)	Miami (FL) (8–0)	Kentucky (7–4)	Notre Dame (12–3) т	Utah State (13–3)	Niagara (10–0)	Colorado State (12–4)	Oklahoma State (14–4)	Auburn (16–2)	Texas Western (17–5)	Oregon State (17–7)	UCLA (19–7)	15.
16.	NYU	Arizona State (2–0)	Minnesota (2–0)	Notre Dame (6–0) т	Wichita (7–2)	Colorado State (7–3)	Auburn (8–1)	Stanford (10–3)	Auburn (11–1) т	Colorado State (11–4)	Notre Dame (13–4) т	Colorado State (14–4)	Oklahoma State (15–4)	UCLA (14–6)	Texas Western (19–6)	Saint Joseph's (21–4) т	16.
17.	UCLA	Ohio State (1–0)	NYU (2–0)	UCLA (4–2) т	Colorado (5–2)	Saint Joseph's (8–2) т	Colorado (8–3)	Kentucky (10–4)	Colorado State (9–3) т	West Virginia (12–4)	Texas (10–5) т	Wichita (14–6)	Utah State (19–5)	Auburn (17–3) т	Bowling Green (17–7)	West Virginia (21–7) т	17.
18.	Colorado State	Indiana (1–0)	St. Bonaventure (2–1)	Wisconsin (3–2)	Georgia Tech (5–0)	Stanford (9–2) т	Saint Joseph's (9–2)	Niagara (8–0) т	DePaul (9–2) т	Miami (FL) (13–2)	DePaul (11–3)	Bradley (12–7) т	Colorado State (16–4)	Providence (17–4) т	Saint Joseph's (21–4)	Bowling Green (18–7)	18.
19.	Creighton	Dayton (1–0)	Seattle (0–0)	Marquette (4–0)	Princeton (6–0)	Kansas (7–4)	California (10–2) т	Texas (8–5) т	Miami (FL) (12–2) т	Texas (8–5) т	Auburn (13–2) т	NYU (12–2) т	UCLA (13–5)	Oregon State (15–7)	Seattle (20–5)	Kansas State (17–8) т	19.
20.	Indiana	USC (2–0)	Iowa State (2–1) т Texas (3–1) т	Princeton (5–0)	North Carolina (4–1)	West Virginia (6–3)	Stanford (9–2) т Utah State (11–3) т Wisconsin (7–3) т	Utah State (12–3)	Niagara (9–0) т	Saint Louis (11–5) т Indiana (7–6) т Oregon (6–8) т	West Virginia (14–5) т	Saint Joseph's (16–3)	Providence (15–5) т Texas Western (15–5) т	Saint Joseph's (20–3)	West Virginia (21–7)	Seattle (21–6) т	20.
	Preseason	Week 2 Dec. 4	Week 3 Dec. 11	Week 4 Dec. 18	Week 5 Dec. 25	Week 6 Jan. 1	Week 7 Jan. 8	Week 8 Jan. 15	Week 9 Jan. 22	Week 10 Jan. 29	Week 11 Feb. 5	Week 12 Feb. 12	Week 13 Feb. 19	Week 14 Feb. 26	Week 15 Mar. 5	Final Mar. 12	
		Dropped: St. Bonaventure; Colorado State	Dropped: Kansas State; Creighton; UCLA; Indiana (1–3); Dayton; USC	Dropped: Drake; NYU; St. Bonaventure; Iowa State; Texas	Dropped: Oregon State; Minnesota; Notre Dame; Wisconsin; Marquette	Dropped: Bowling Green; Seattle; Virginia Tech; USC; Colorado; Princeton	Dropped: Miami (FL); Kansas	Dropped: North Carolina; Auburn; Saint Joseph's; California; Wisconsin	Dropped: Notre Dame; Kentucky; Texas	Dropped: Auburn; DePaul	Dropped: Niagara; Miami (FL); Saint Louis; Indiana; Oregon	Dropped: Notre Dame; DePaul; Auburn; West Virginia	Dropped: Bradley; Saint Joseph's	Dropped: Oklahoma State; Utah State	Dropped: Colorado; UCLA; Auburn	Dropped: Colorado State; Texas Western	
