= 1962–63 Bowling Green Falcons men's basketball team =

American college basketball season

1962–63 Bowling Green Falcons men's basketball

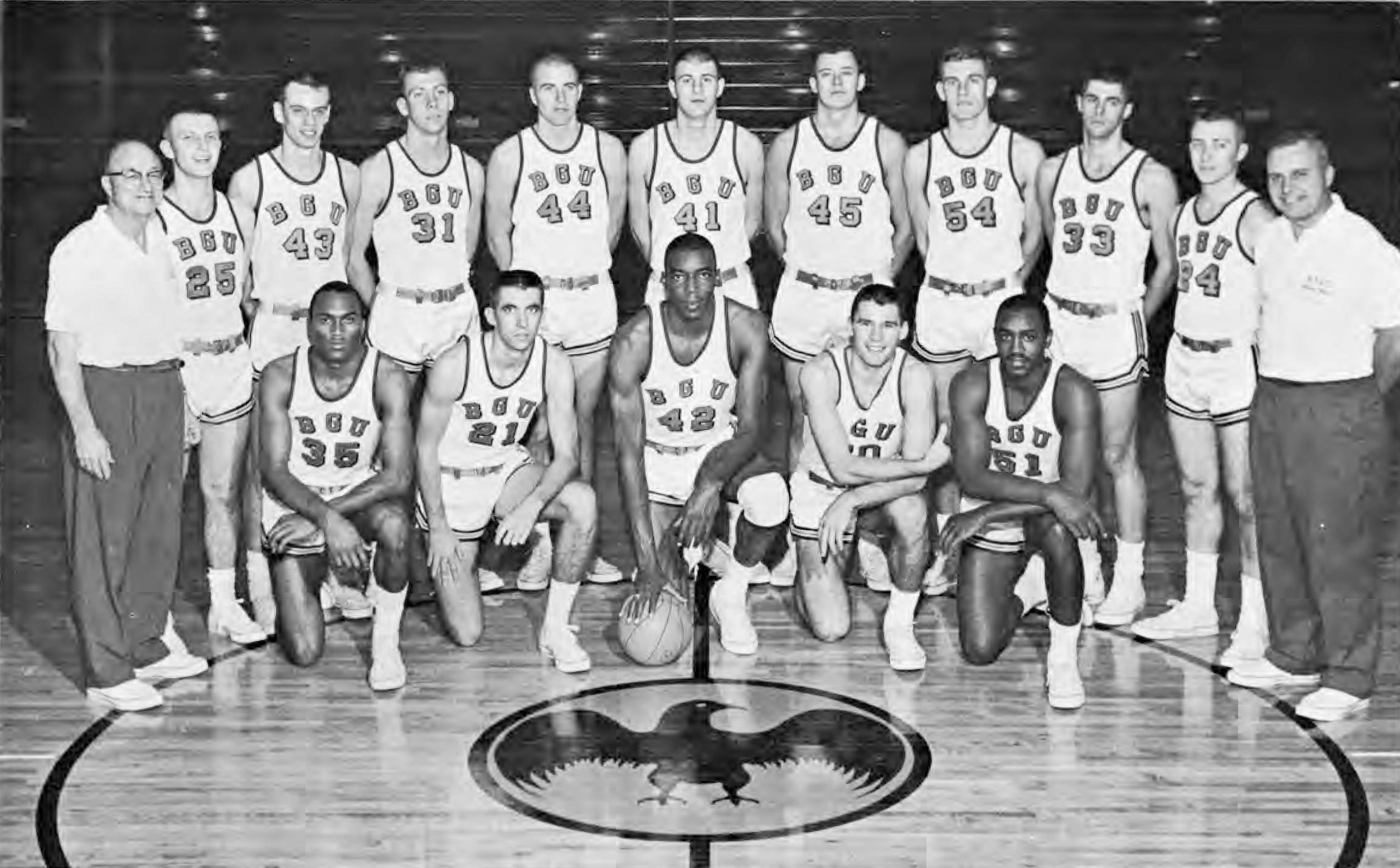

MAC Champions

NCAA tournament
- Conference: Mid-American Conference
- East

Ranking
- Coaches: No. 18
- Record: 19–8 (9–3 MAC)
- Head coach: Harold Anderson

1962–63 Mid-American Conference men's basketball standings
| | Conf. | | | | Overall |
| Team | W | | L | PCT | W | | L | PCT |
|---|---|---|---|---|---|---|---|---|
| Bowling Green State | 9 | – | 3 | .750 | 19 | – | 8 | .704 |
| Ohio | 8 | – | 4 | .667 | 13 | – | 11 | .542 |
| Toledo | 8 | – | 4 | .667 | 13 | – | 11 | .542 |
| Miami (Ohio) | 8 | – | 4 | .667 | 12 | – | 12 | .500 |
| Western Michigan | 7 | – | 5 | .583 | 12 | – | 12 | .500 |
| Marshall | 1 | – | 11 | .083 | 7 | – | 16 | .304 |
| Kent State | 1 | – | 11 | .083 | 3 | – | 18 | .143 |
Rankings from AP Poll

The 1962–63 Bowling Green Falcons men's basketball team was an NCAA University Division college basketball team competing in the Mid-American Conference. They finished with 19 wins and 8 losses, and in conference play, they led the MAC with 9 wins and 3 losses. In the 1963 NCAA tournament, they beat Notre Dame in the Mideast regional quarterfinal before falling to Illinois in the regional semifinal.

== Roster ==
1962–63 Bowling Green Falcons men's basketball team
| Players | Coaches |
|---|---|
| Pos. / # / Name / Height / Weight / Year / Previous school / Hometown | Head coach: Harold Anderson (Otterbein); Assistant coach(es) Legend: (C) Team captain; (S) Suspended; (I) Ineligible; (W) Walk-on; Injured; Current redshirt |
