= 1962–63 Washington Huskies men's basketball team =

American college basketball season

1962–63 Washington Huskies men's basketball
- Conference: Athletic Association of Western Universities
- Record: 13–13 (6–6 AAWU, Big Five)
- Head coach: John Grayson (4th season)
- Assistant coach: Mac Duckworth
- Home arena: Hec Edmundson Pavilion

1962–63 AAWU Conference men's basketball standings
	Conf.				Overall
Team	W		L	PCT	W		L	PCT
UCLA †	7	–	5	.583	20	–	9	.690
Stanford	7	–	5	.583	16	–	9	.640
USC	6	–	6	.500	20	–	9	.690
Washington	6	–	6	.500	13	–	13	.500
California	4	–	8	.333	13	–	11	.542
† Conference playoff game winner Rankings from AP Poll

The 1962–63 Washington Huskies men's basketball team represented the University of Washington for the 1962–63 NCAA University Division basketball season. Led by fourth-year head coach John Grayson, the Huskies were members of the Athletic Association of Western Universities (Big Five) and played their home games on campus at Hec Edmundson Pavilion in Seattle, Washington.

The Huskies were 13–13 overall in the regular season and 6–6 in conference play, tied for third in the standings.

Grayson was relieved of his duties on April 13 by athletic director Jim Owens, and assistant Mac Duckworth was promoted to head coach ten days later.
