= 1963 NCAA University Division basketball tournament =

Edition of USA college basketball tournament

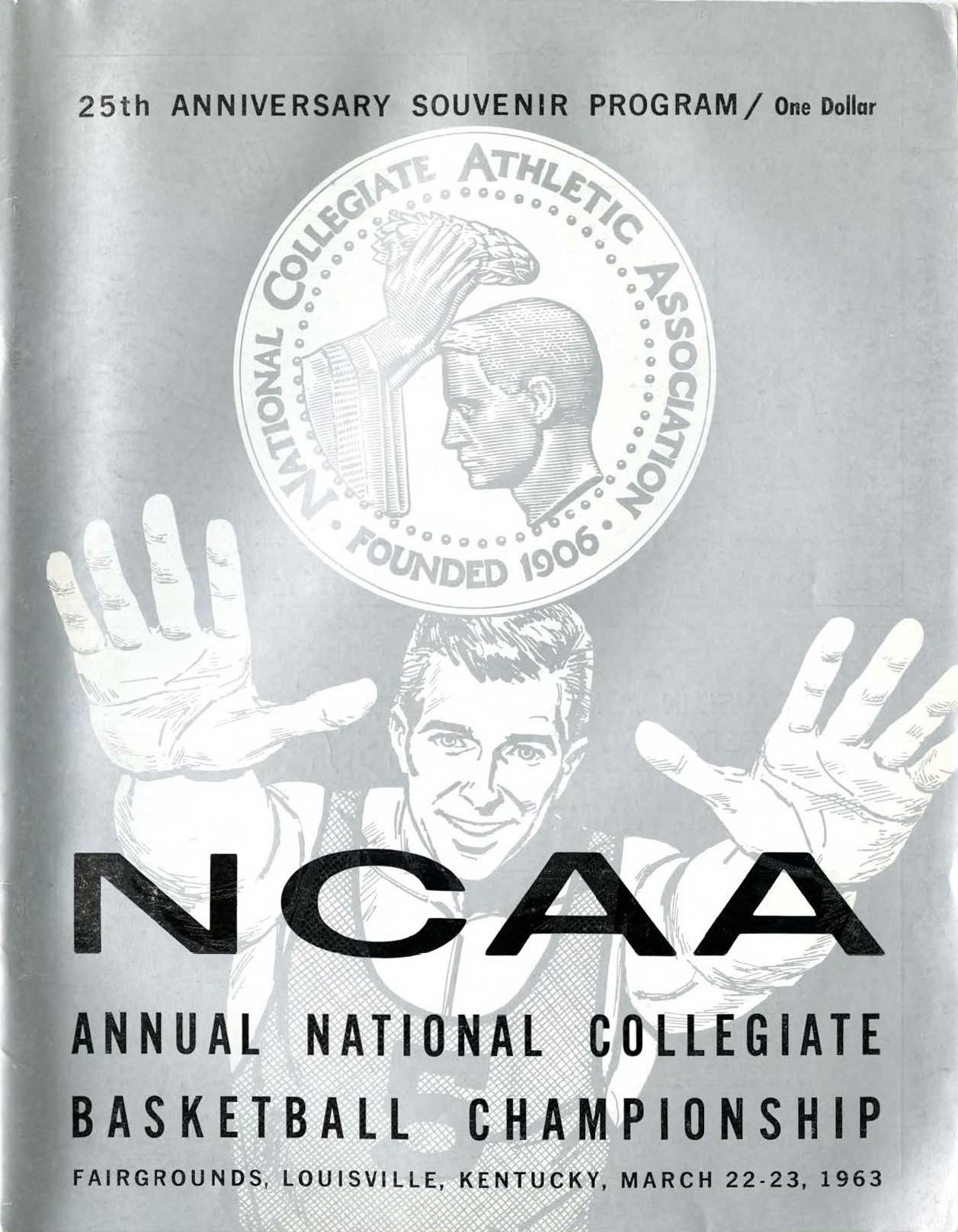
- Cover from the official program
- Season: 1962–63
- Teams: 25
- Finals site: Freedom Hall, Louisville, Kentucky
- Champions: Loyola Ramblers (1st title, 1st title game, 1st Final Four)
- Runner-up: Cincinnati Bearcats (3rd title game, 5th Final Four)
- Semifinalists: Duke Blue Devils (1st Final Four); Oregon State Beavers (2nd Final Four)
- Winning coach: George Ireland (1st title)
- MOP: Art Heyman (Duke)
- Attendance: 153,065
- Top scorer: Mel Counts (Oregon State) (123 points)

The 1963 NCAA University Division basketball tournament involved 25 schools playing in single-elimination play to determine the national champion of men's NCAA Division I college basketball in the United States. The 25th annual edition of the tournament began on March 9, 1963, and ended with the championship game on March 23, at Freedom Hall in Louisville, Kentucky. A total of 29 games were played, including a third-place game in each region and a national third-place game.

Loyola University Chicago, coached by George Ireland, won the national title with a 60–58 overtime victory in the final game, over the University of Cincinnati, coached by Ed Jucker. Art Heyman, of Duke University, was named the tournament's Most Outstanding Player. This tournament marked the last time that a city was host to two straight Final Fours.

== Locations ==
First round (green), Regionals (blue), and Final Four (red)

Round	Region	Location	Venue
First Round	East	Philadelphia, Pennsylvania	The Palestra
First Round	Mideast	Evanston, Illinois	McGaw Memorial Hall
First Round	Midwest	Lubbock, Texas	Lubbock Municipal Coliseum
First Round	West	Eugene, Oregon	McArthur Court
Regionals	East	College Park, Maryland	Cole Field House
Regionals	Mideast	East Lansing, Michigan	Jenison Fieldhouse
Regionals	Midwest	Lawrence, Kansas	Allen Fieldhouse
Regionals	West	Provo, Utah	Smith Fieldhouse
Final Four		Louisville, Kentucky	Freedom Hall

== Teams ==
Region	Team	Coach	Conference	Finished	Final Opponent	Score	Qualification
East
East	Connecticut	George Wigton	Yankee	First round	West Virginia	L 77–71	Yankee Conference champion
East	Duke	Vic Bubas	Atlantic Coast	Third Place	Oregon State	W 85–63	ACC tournament champion
East	NYU	Lou Rossini	Metro NY	Regional Fourth Place	West Virginia	L 83–73	At-large bid
East	Pittsburgh	Bob Timmons	Independent	First round	NYU	L 93–83	At-large bid
East	Princeton	Butch van Breda Kolff	Ivy League	First round	Saint Joseph's	L 82–81	Ivy League co-champion (Note: Princeton won a tiebreaker play-off game against Fordham to earn a tournament berth.)
East	Saint Joseph's	Jack Ramsay	Middle Atlantic	Regional Runner-up	Duke	L 73–59	MAC champion
East	West Virginia	George King	Southern	Regional third place	NYU	W 83–73	SoCon tournament champion
Mideast
Mideast	Bowling Green	Harold Anderson	Mid-American	Regional Fourth Place	Mississippi State	L 65–60	MAC champion
Mideast	Illinois	Harry Combes	Big Ten	Regional Runner-up	Loyola–Chicago	L 79–64	Big Ten co-champion (Note: Ohio State had been in the previous year's tournament, so Illinois was awarded the tournament berth.)
Mideast	Loyola–Chicago	George Ireland	Independent	Champion	Cincinnati	W 60–58	At-large bid
Mideast	Mississippi State	Babe McCarthy	Southeastern	Regional third place	Bowling Green	W 65–60	SEC champion
Mideast	Notre Dame	John Jordan	Independent	First round	Bowling Green	L 77–72	At-large bid
Mideast	Tennessee Tech	Johnny Oldham	Ohio Valley	First round	Loyola–Chicago	L 111–42	OVC champion
Midwest
Midwest	Cincinnati	Ed Jucker	Missouri Valley	Runner Up	Loyola–Chicago	L 60–58	MVC champion
Midwest	Colorado	Sox Walseth	Big Eight	Regional Runner-up	Cincinnati	L 67–60	Big Eight co-champion (Note: Colorado had won both their games against co-champion Kansas State that season, so they were awarded the tournament berth.)
Midwest	Colorado State	Jim Williams	Independent	First round	Oklahoma City	L 70–67	At-large bid
Midwest	Oklahoma City	Abe Lemons	Independent	Regional Fourth Place	Texas	L 90–83	At-large bid
Midwest	Texas	Harold Bradley	Southwest	Regional third place	Oklahoma City	W 90–83	SWC champion
Midwest	Texas Western	Don Haskins	Independent	First round	Texas	L 65–47	At-large bid
West
West	Arizona State	Ned Wulk	Western Athletic	Regional Runner-up	Oregon State	L 83–65	WAC champion
West	Oregon State	Slats Gill	Independent	Fourth Place	Duke	L 85–63	At-large bid
West	San Francisco	Pete Peletta	West Coast Athletic	Regional third place	UCLA	W 76–75	WCAC champion
West	Seattle	Clair Markey	Independent	First round	Oregon State	L 70–66	At-large bid
West	UCLA	John Wooden	AAWU	Regional Fourth Place	San Francisco	L 76–75	Big Six co-champion (Note: UCLA won in a tiebreaker play-off game against Stanford to earn a tournament berth.)
West	Utah State	LaDell Andersen	Independent	First round	Arizona State	L 79–75	At-large bid

== Bracket ==
* – Denotes overtime period

=== East region ===
Quarterfinals
NYU	93
Pittsburgh	83
West Virginia	77
Connecticut	71
Saint Joseph's	82
Princeton	81*

Semifinals
Duke	81
NYU	76
West Virginia	88
Saint Joseph's	97

Finals
Duke	73
Saint Joseph's	59
Third place
West Virginia	83
NYU	73

=== Mideast region ===
Quarterfinals
Bowling Green	77
Notre Dame	72
Loyola–Chicago	111
Tennessee Tech	42

Semifinals
Illinois	70
Bowling Green	67
Mississippi State	51
Loyola–Chicago	61

Finals
Illinois	64
Loyola–Chicago	79
Third place
Mississippi State	65
Bowling Green	60

=== Midwest region ===
Quarterfinals
Oklahoma City	70
Colorado State	67
Texas	65
Texas Western	47

Semifinals
Colorado	78
Oklahoma City	72
Cincinnati	73
Texas	68

Finals
Colorado	60
Cincinnati	67
Third place
Texas	90
Oklahoma City	83

=== West region ===
Quarterfinals
Arizona State	79
Utah State	75*
Oregon State	70
Seattle	66

Semifinals
UCLA	79
Arizona State	93
San Francisco	61
Oregon State	65

Finals
Arizona State	65
Oregon State	83
Third place
San Francisco	76
UCLA	75

=== Final Four ===
National Semifinals
E	Duke	75
ME	Loyola–Chicago	94
MW	Cincinnati	80
W	Oregon State	46

National Championship Game
ME	Loyola–Chicago	60(OT)
MW	Cincinnati	58
Third place
E	Duke	85
W	Oregon State	63

== See also ==
- 1963 NCAA College Division basketball tournament
- 1963 National Invitation Tournament
- 1963 NAIA basketball tournament
- Black participation in college basketball

== Notes ==
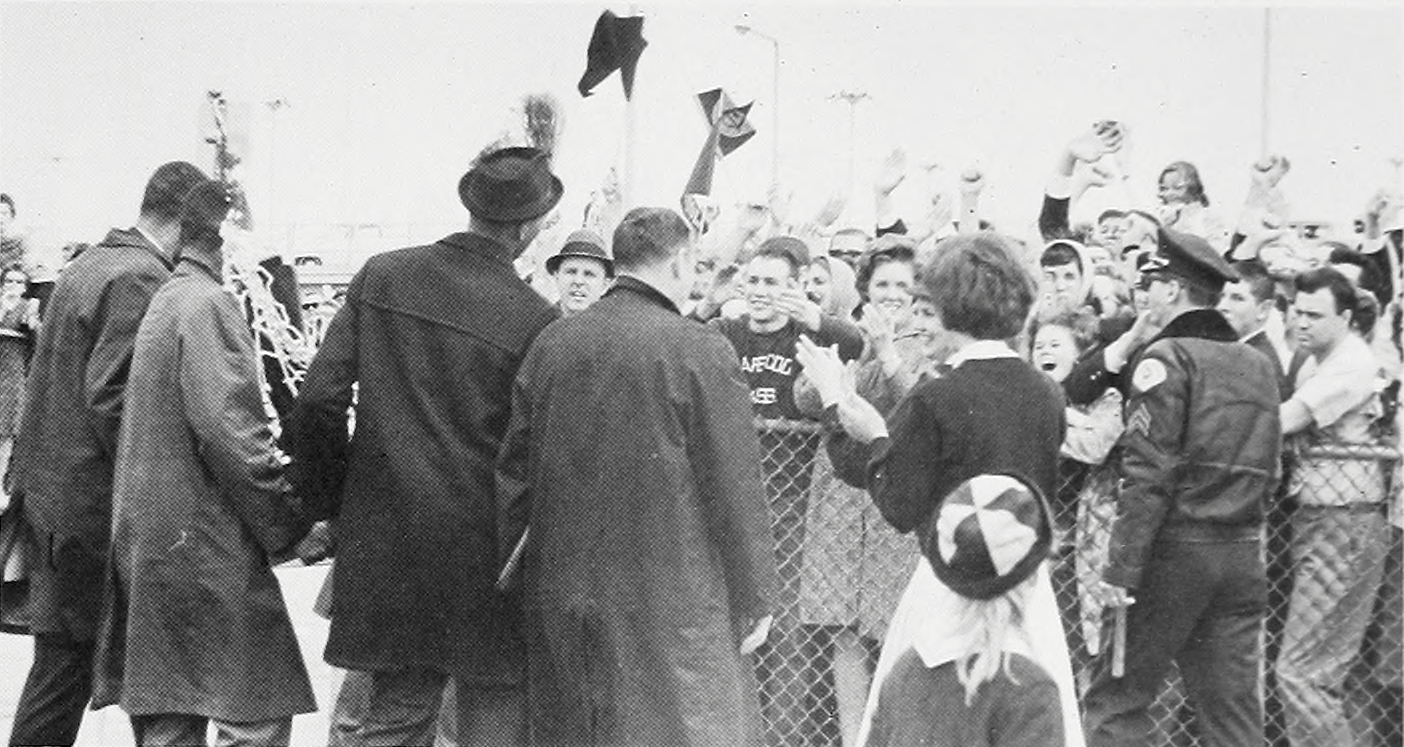
The Loyola Ramblers show off their championship trophy as they arrive home at O'Hare International Airport.

- In the Loyola vs. Mississippi State game at East Lansing, Michigan in a Mideast regional semifinal, Mississippi State, an all-white team, played despite protests from the governor and state police of Mississippi. Mississippi State overcame a state prohibition against playing integrated teams. Loyola beat Mississippi State and went on to the Mideast Region Championship game. The Loyola–Mississippi State has since been dubbed the "Game of Change".
- In the National Championship game, Loyola started four African-Americans and Cincinnati started three, marking the first time that a majority of African-Americans participated in the championship game.
- Loyola was the tenth and, as of 2022, most recent team to win the tournament in their first appearance, joining Oregon (1939), Indiana (1940), Wisconsin (1941), Stanford (1942), Utah (1944), Oklahoma State (1945), Holy Cross (1947), La Salle (1954) and San Francisco (1955).
- Loyola's first-round regional victory over Tennessee Tech, 111–42, continues to be a record margin of victory for an NCAA men's basketball tournament game. That game also remains Tennessee Tech's most recent tournament game, as the Golden Eagles have not been back since. Tennessee Tech's 59-year drought is the second longest active drought after Dartmouth, who has not made the tournament since 1959, and third all-time behind Dartmouth and Harvard, who went 66 years (1946–2012) between tournament appearances.
- In addition to Loyola, two other teams - Mississippi State and Texas Western - both made their tournament debuts. The Bulldogs had been eligible three times before (in 1959, 1961 and 1962, the last year being tied with Kentucky), but all three times had been prohibited by the state due to its prohibition against playing integrated teams. Texas Western, who were an independent team following the disbandment of the Border Conference the year prior, lost their first tournament game to in-state rival Texas, whom they had beaten 45–40 on December 29 at home. They would also make history three years later when they won the 1966 tournament with an all-black starting five.
