= 1962–63 North Carolina Tar Heels men's basketball team =

American college basketball season

1962–63 North Carolina Tar Heels men's basketball
- Conference: Atlantic Coast Conference
- Record: 15–6 (10–4 ACC)
- Head coach: Dean Smith (2nd season)
- Home arena: Woollen Gymnasium

1962–63 ACC men's basketball standings
	Conf.				Overall
Team	W		L	PCT	W		L	PCT
No. 2 Duke †	14	–	0	1.000	27	–	3	.900
Wake Forest	11	–	3	.786	16	–	10	.615
North Carolina	10	–	4	.714	15	–	6	.714
Clemson	5	–	9	.357	12	–	13	.480
NC State	5	–	9	.357	10	–	11	.476
South Carolina	4	–	10	.286	9	–	15	.375
Maryland	4	–	10	.286	8	–	13	.381
Virginia	3	–	11	.214	5	–	20	.200
† 1963 ACC tournament winner Rankings from AP Poll

The 1962–63 North Carolina Tar Heels men's basketball team represented the University of North Carolina at Chapel Hill during the 1962–63 men's college basketball season.

== Schedule ==
Date time, TV	Rank^{#}	Opponent^{#}	Result	Record	Site city, state
December 1*		Georgia	W 89–65		Woollen Gymnasium; Chapel Hill, NC
December 5		Clemson	W 64–48		Woollen Gymnasium; Chapel Hill, NC
December 8		at South Carolina	W 75–65		Columbia, SC
December 15*		at Indiana	L 76–90		New Fieldhouse; Bloomington, IN
December 17*		at Kentucky	W 68–66		Lexington, KY
January 2*		Yale	W 86–77		Woollen Gymnasium; Chapel Hill, NC
January 5*		at Notre Dame	W 76–68 ^{OT}		Notre Dame Fieldhouse; South Bend, IN
January 9	No. 10	at Wake Forest	L 70–78		Winston–Salem Memorial Coliseum; Winston-Salem, NC
January 14	No. 10	at Maryland	W 78–56		Cole Field House; College Park, MD
January 16		NC State	W 67–65 ^{OT}		Woollen Gymnasium; Chapel Hill, NC
January 19		at Virginia	W 86–81		Memorial Gymnasium; Charlottesville, VA
February 2		No. 3 Duke; Rivalry	L 69–77		Woollen Gymnasium; Chapel Hill, NC
February 7		Maryland	W 82–68		Woollen Gymnasium; Chapel Hill, NC
February 9		Wake Forest	L 71–72		Woollen Gymnasium; Chapel Hill, NC
February 12		at NC State	W 68–63		Reynolds Coliseum; Raleigh, NC
February 15		vs. South Carolina; North-South Doubleheader	W 78–74		Charlotte Coliseum; Charlotte, NC
February 16		vs. Clemson; North-South Doubleheader	W 79–63		Charlotte Coliseum; Charlotte, NC
February 20		Virginia	W 85–73		Woollen Gymnasium; Chapel Hill, NC
February 23		at No. 2 Duke; Rivalry	L 93–106		Cameron Indoor Stadium; Durham, NC
February 28*		vs. South Carolina; ACC tournament	W 93–76		Reynolds Coliseum; Raleigh, NC
March 1*		vs. Wake Forest; ACC Tournament	L 55–56		Reynolds Coliseum; Raleigh, NC
*Non-conference game. ^{#}Rankings from AP Poll. (#) Tournament seedings in parentheses.
