= AP College Basketball Player of the Year =

Annual college basketball award

- Awarded for: the most outstanding men's and women's college basketball players
- Country: United States
- Presented by: Accredited Associated Press media voters

History
- First award: 1961 (men); 1995 (women)
- Most recent: Cameron Boozer, Duke (men); Sarah Strong, UConn (women)

The AP College Basketball Player of the Year is an award given by the Associated Press (AP) that recognizes the best men's and women's college basketball players of the year in the United States. The men's award began in 1961 while the women's began in 1995. The AP Player of the Year is one of the major national player of the year awards.

According to APNews.com, "Voting is done at the conclusion of the regular season and before the NCAA tournament starts. Voting is based on regular season performance. The men's panel is made up of 62 media members who regularly cover college basketball and vote in The Associated Press Top 25 men's college basketball poll. The women's panel consists of 35 media members. The voting panel includes local beat writers at newspapers and broadcast outlets, along with national media."

There have only been two total players, one on each of the men's and women's sides, to be named the AP Player of the Year three times: Ralph Sampson of Virginia (1981–1983), and Breanna Stewart of UConn (2014–2016).

== Key ==
Player (X)	Denotes the number of times the player has been awarded the AP Player of the Year at that point

== Winners ==
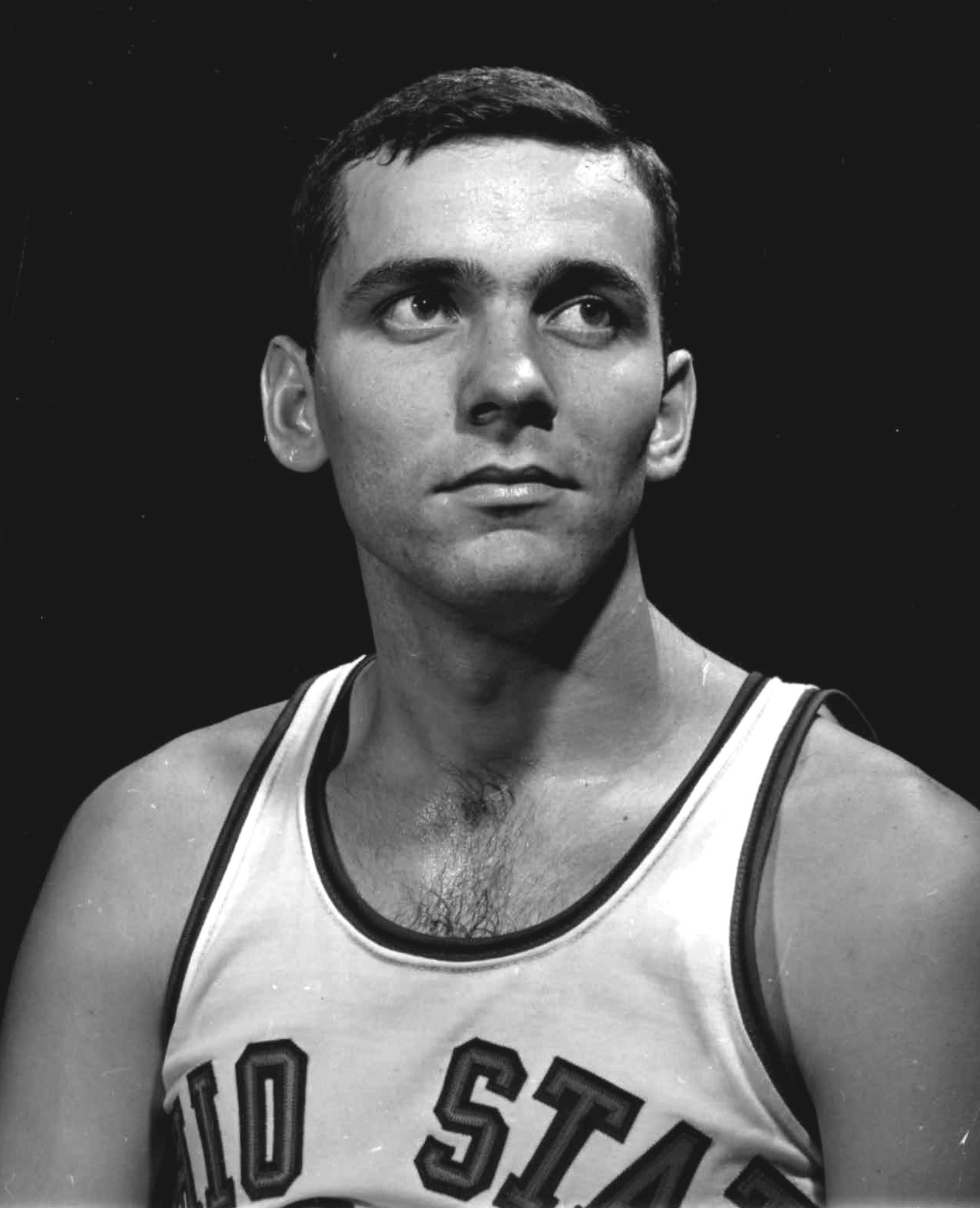
Jerry Lucas, Ohio State, 1961 and 1962

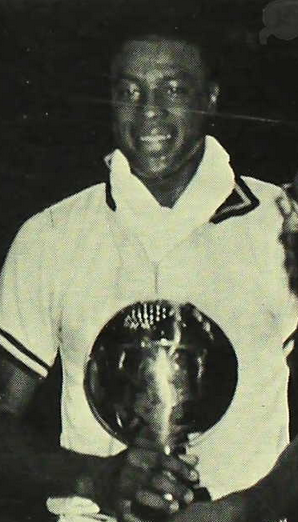
Cazzie Russell, Michigan, 1966

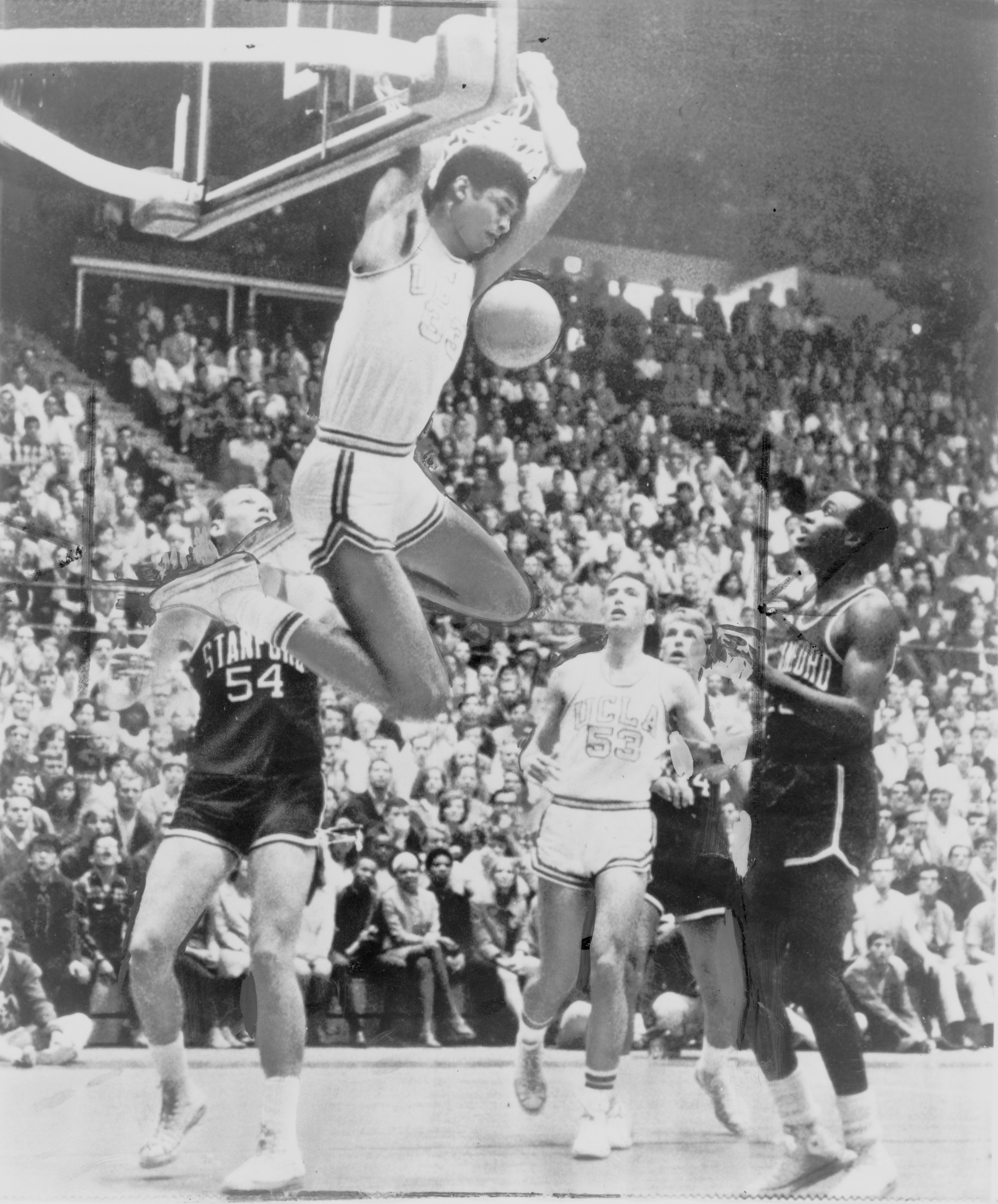
Lew Alcindor^{[a]}, UCLA, 1967 and 1969

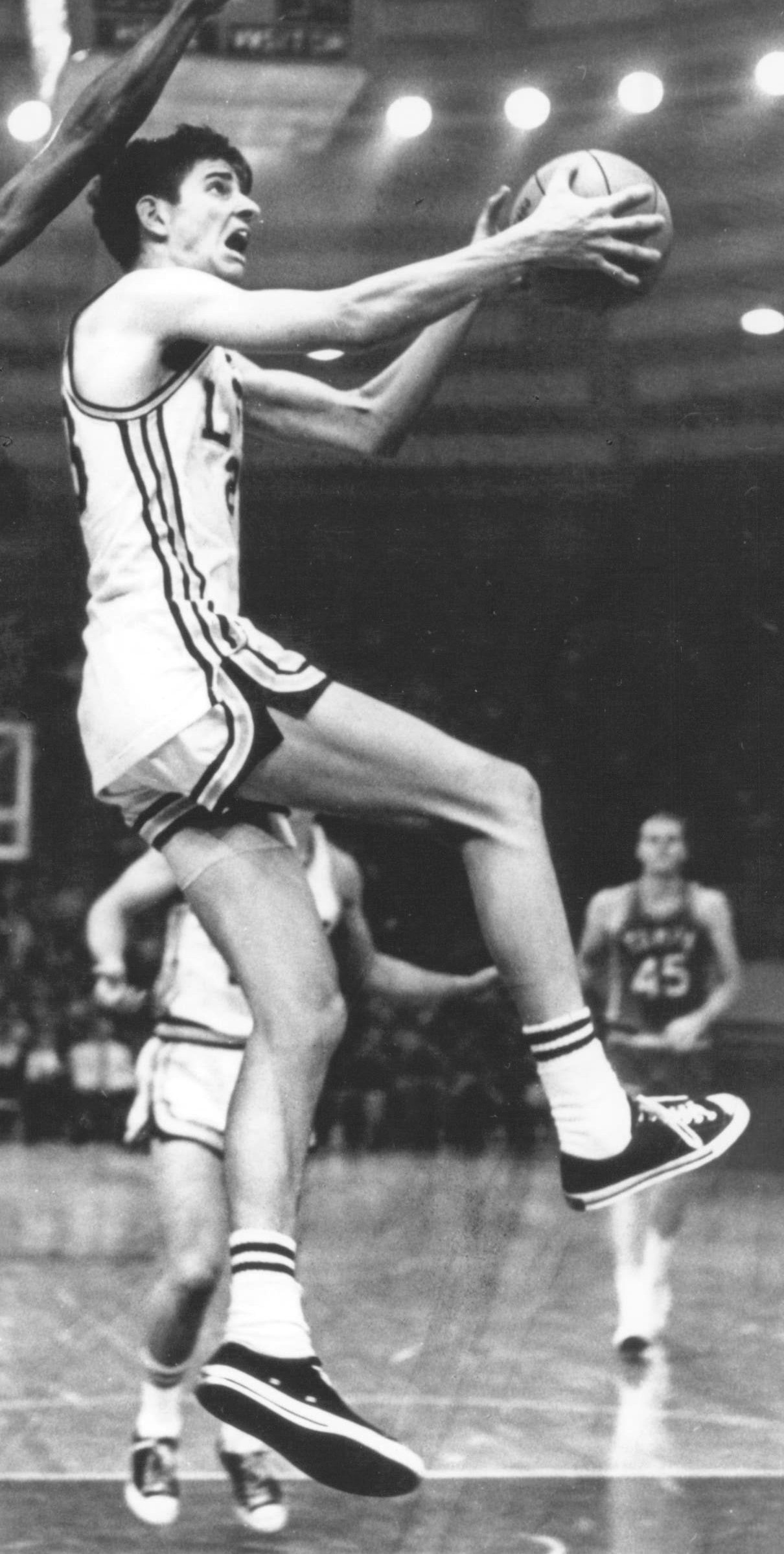
Pete Maravich, LSU, 1970

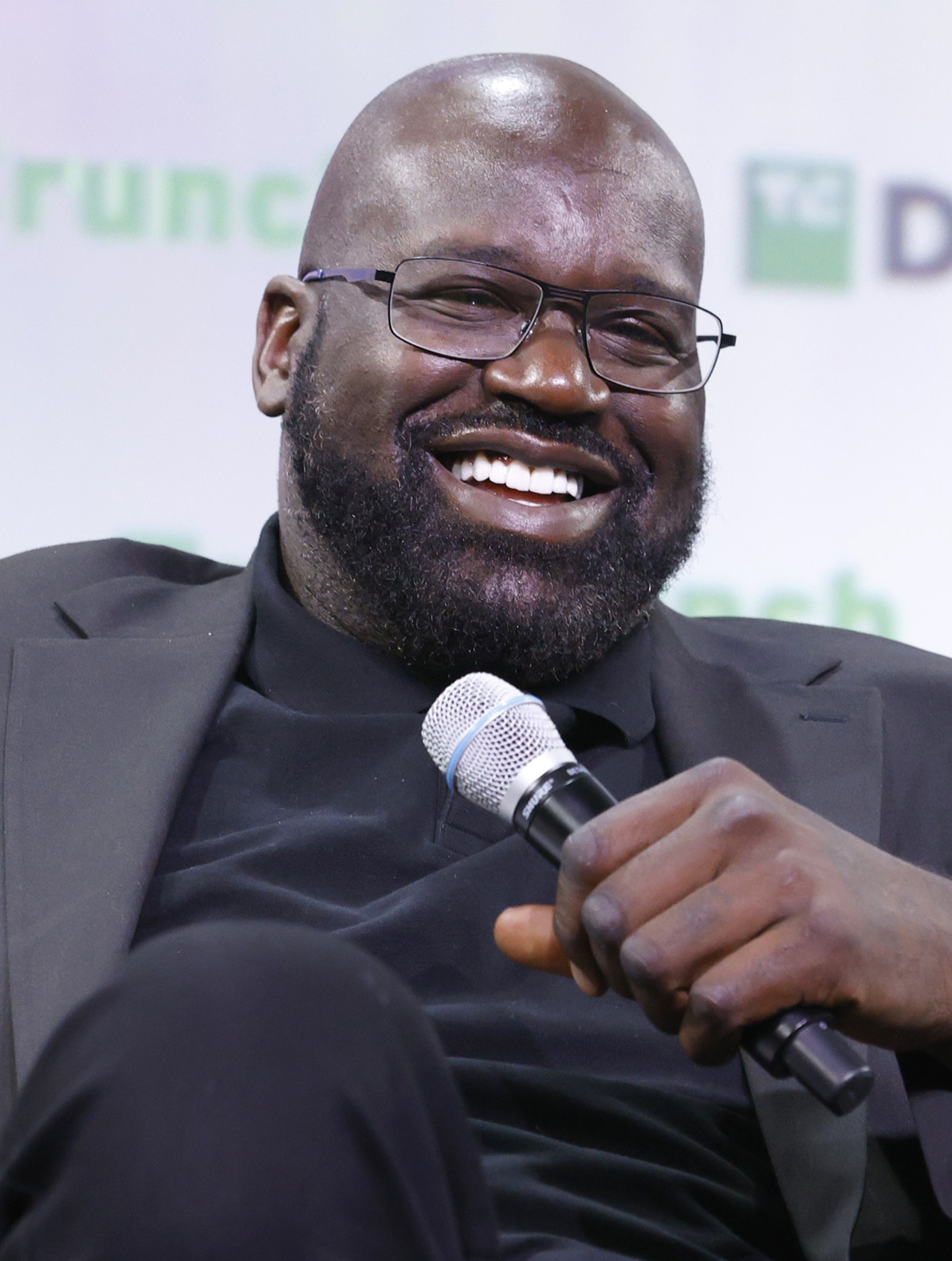
Shaquille O'Neal, LSU, 1991

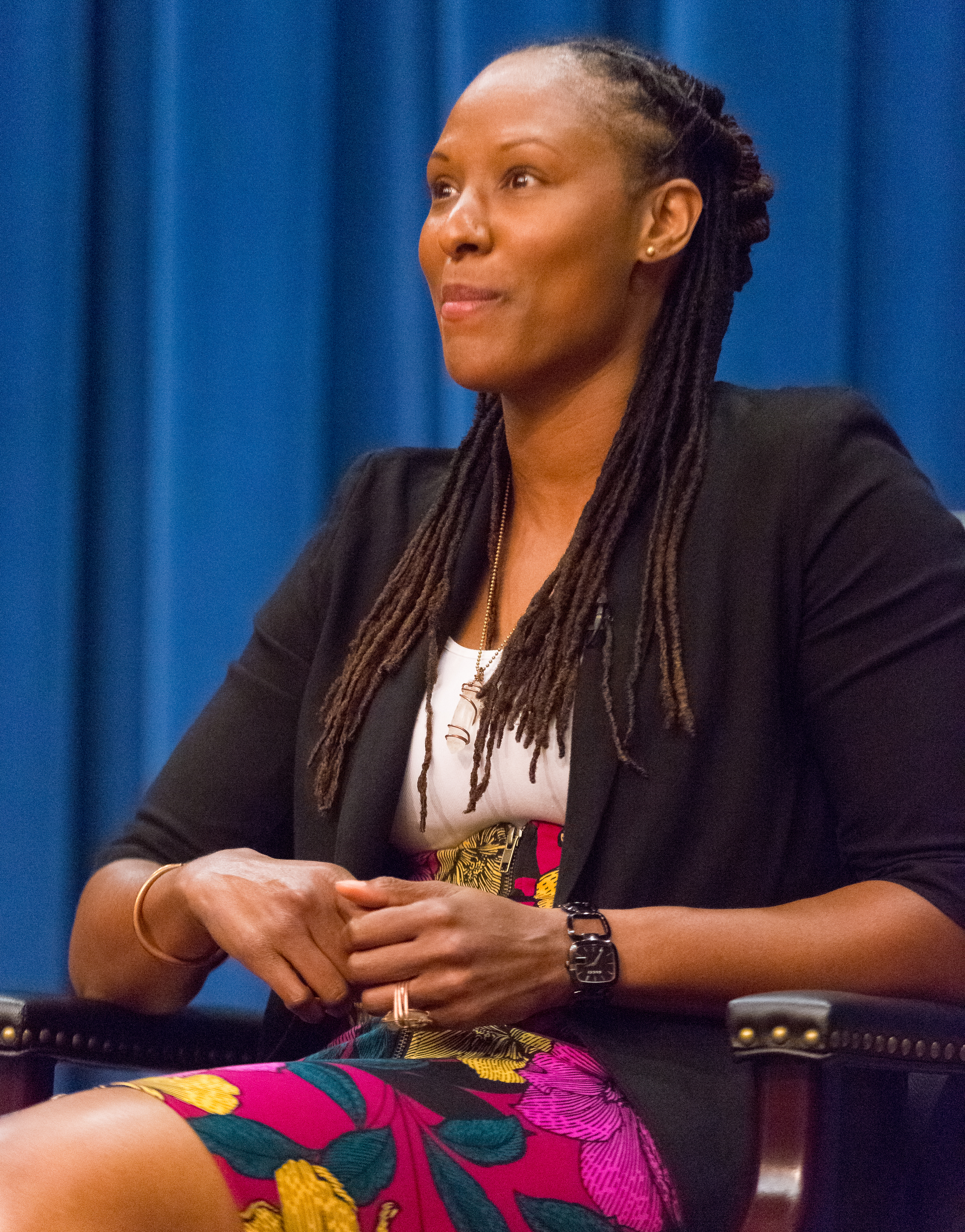
Chamique Holdsclaw, Tennessee, 1998 and 1999

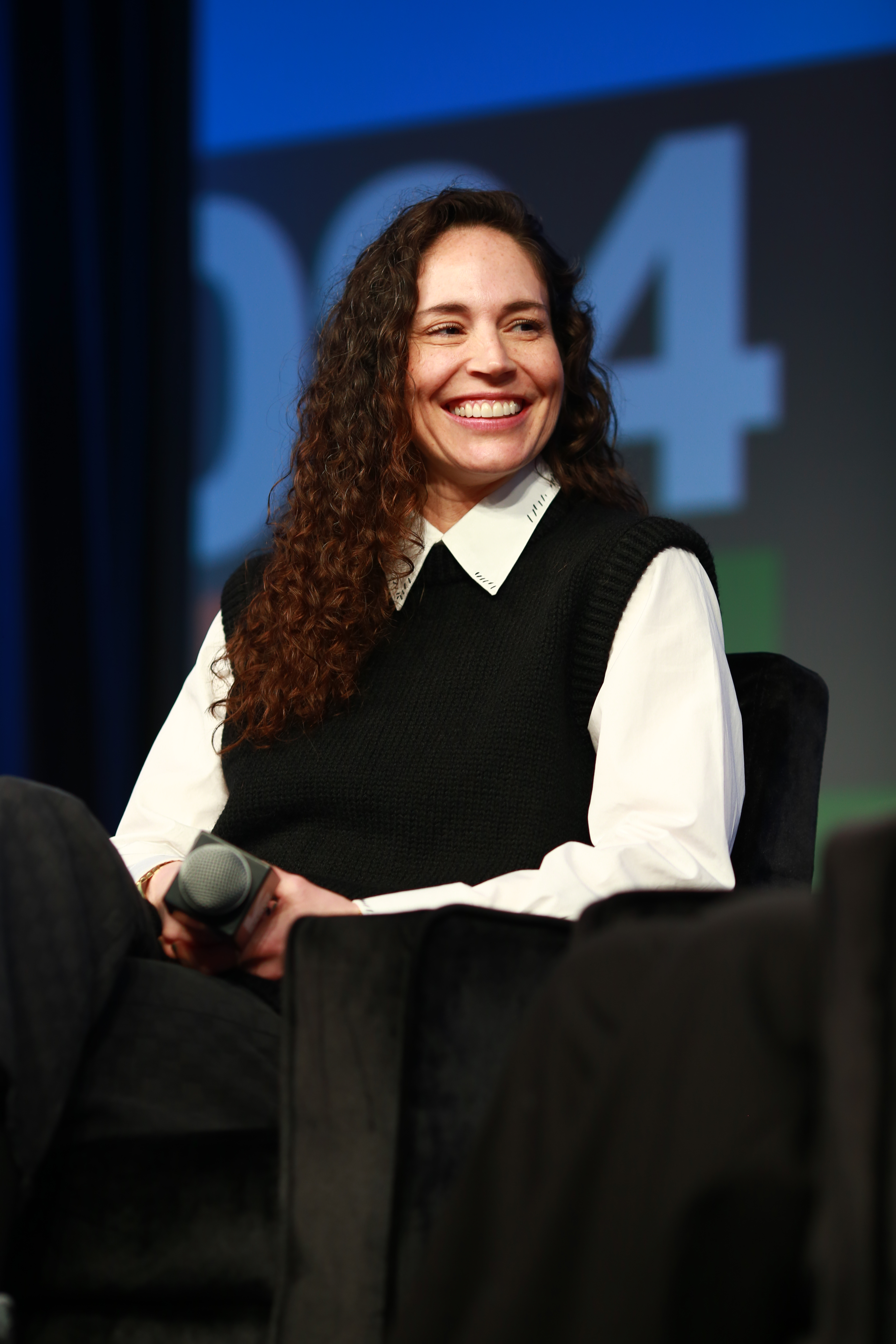
Sue Bird, UConn, 2002

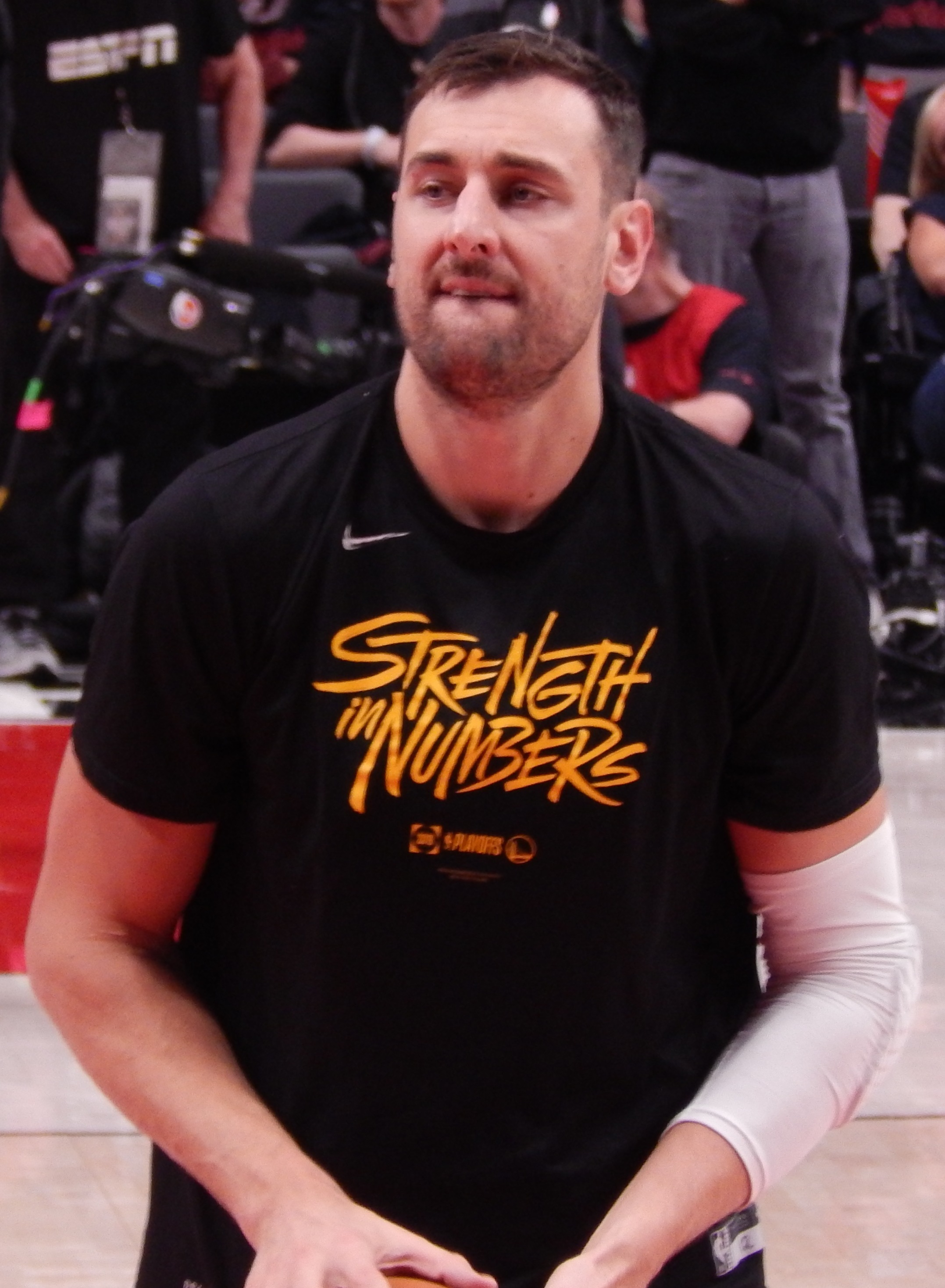
Andrew Bogut, Utah, 2005

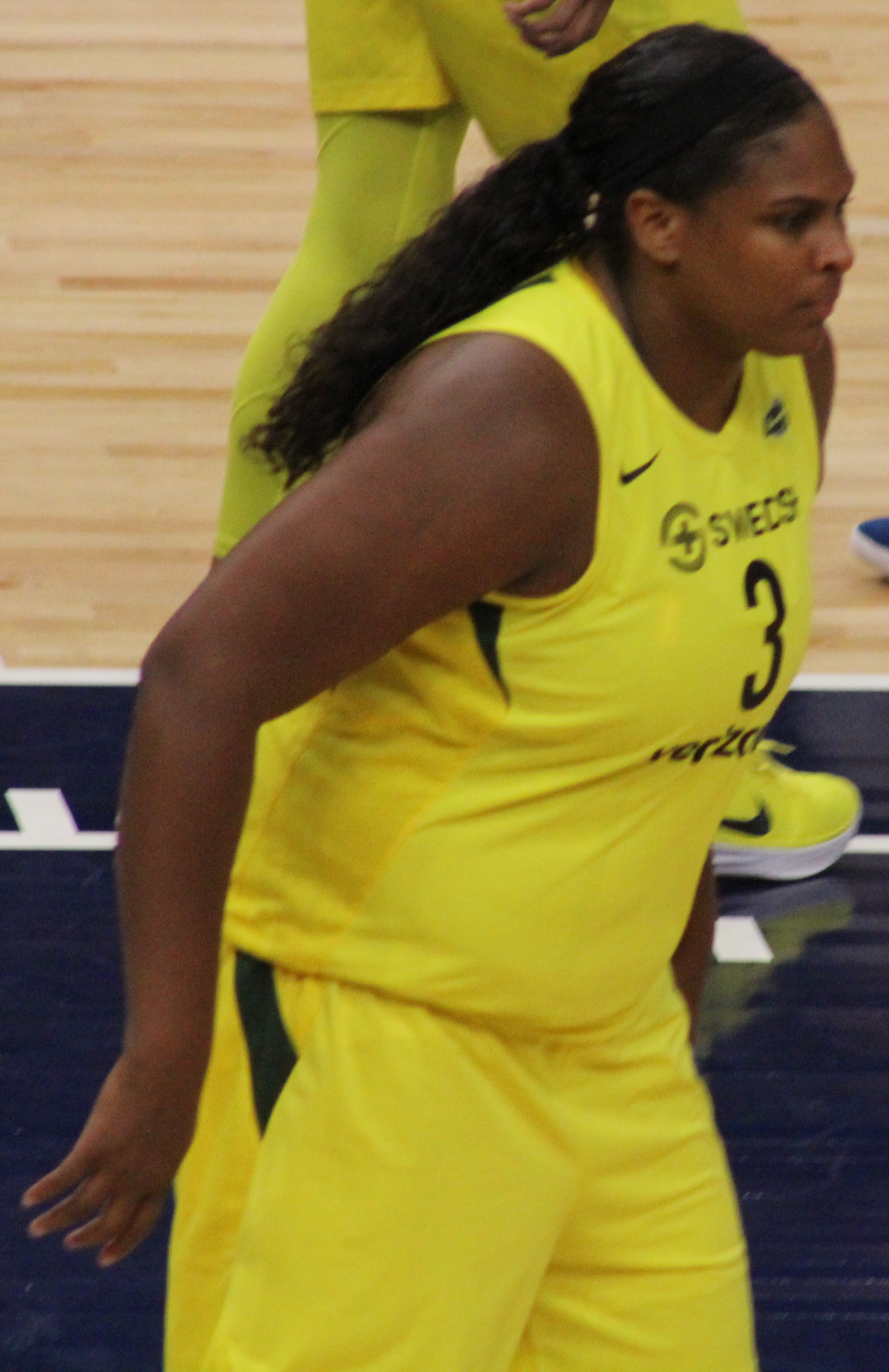
Courtney Paris, Oklahoma, 2007

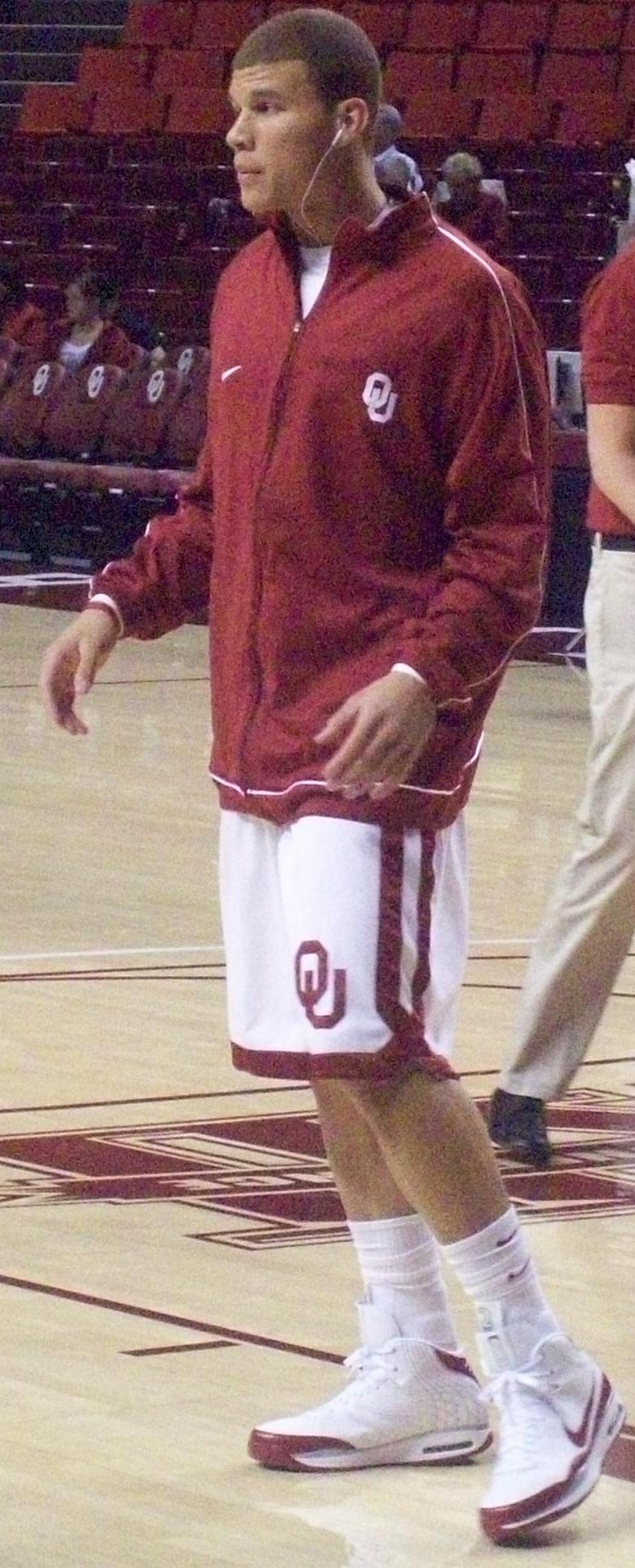
Blake Griffin, Oklahoma, 2009

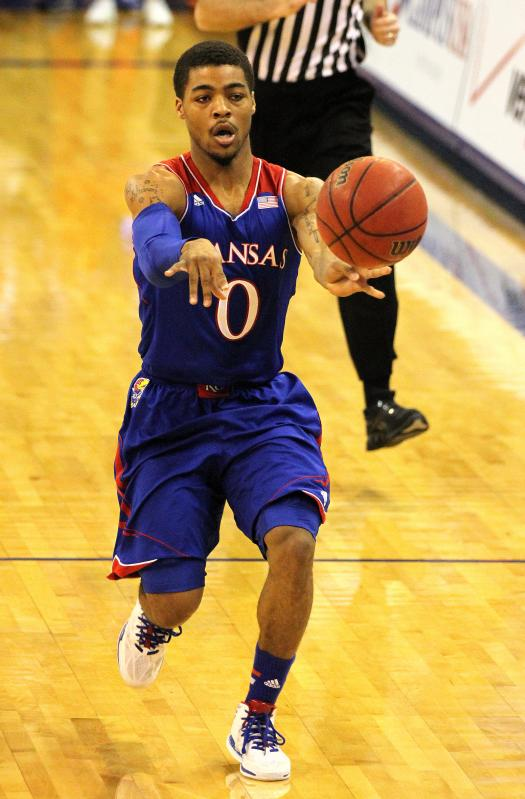
Frank Mason III, Kansas, 2017

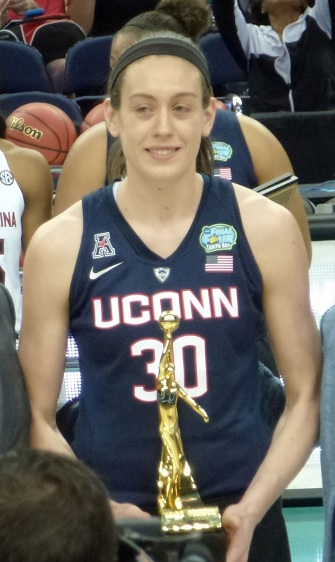
Breanna Stewart, UConn, 2014 through 2016

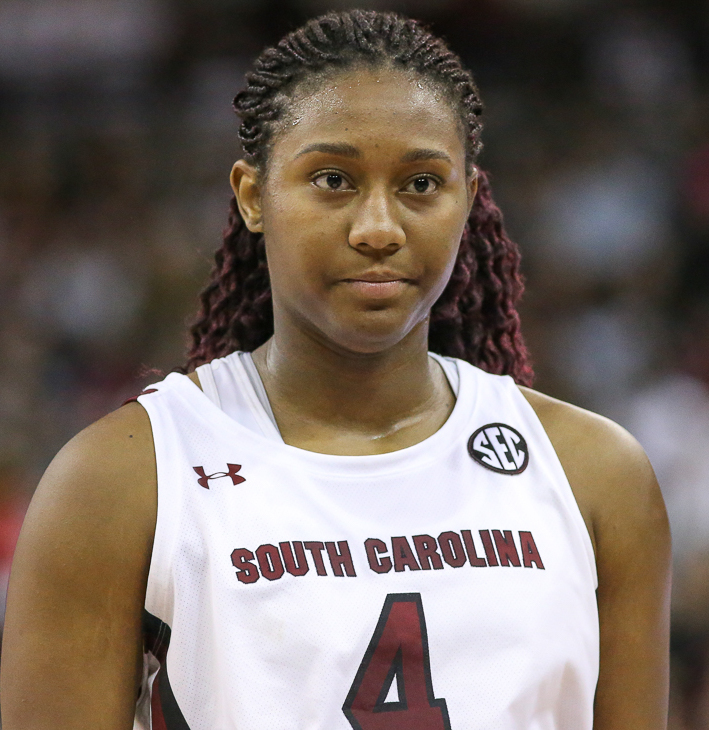
Aliyah Boston, South Carfolina, 2022

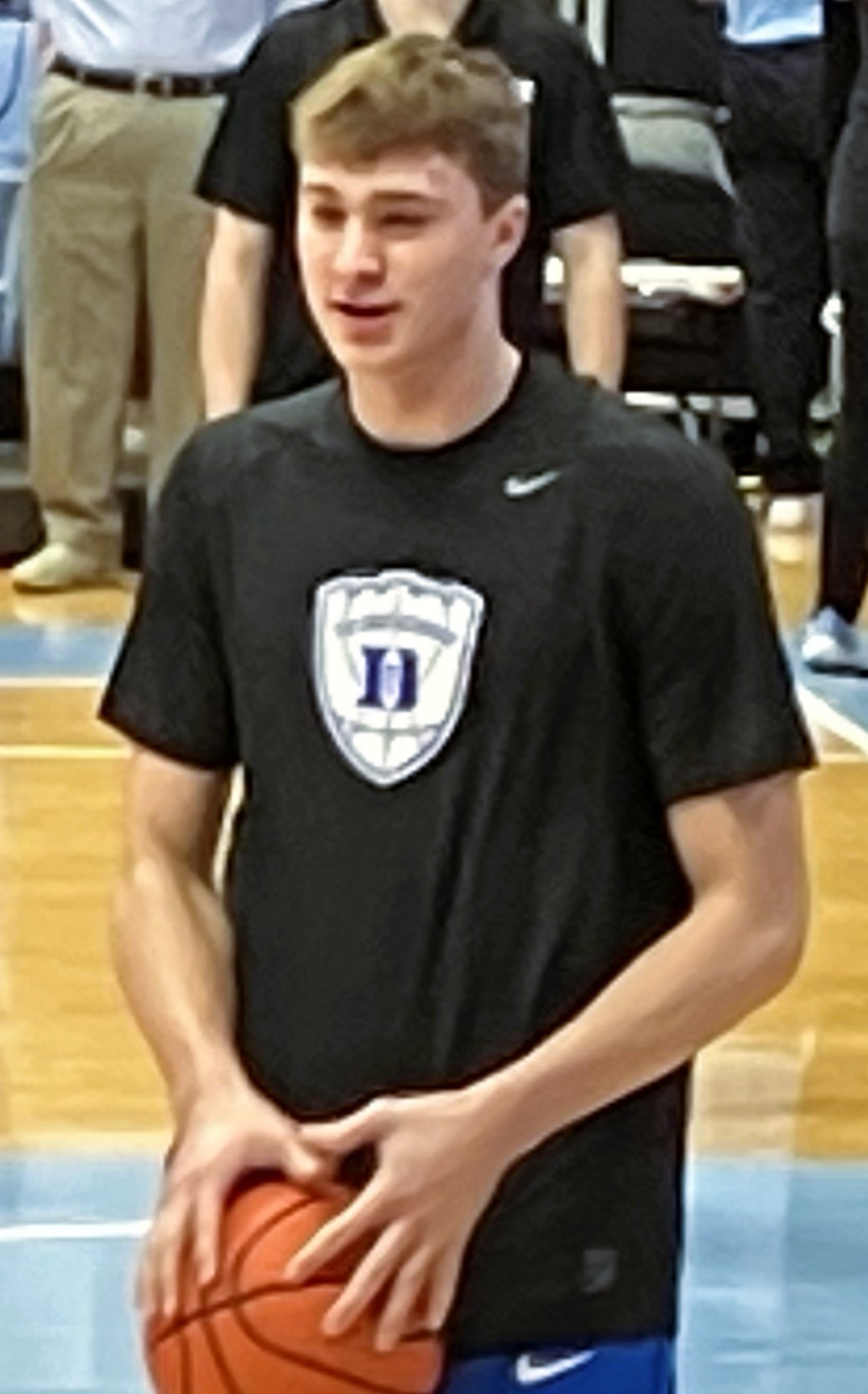
Cooper Flagg, Duke, 2025

Men
Season	Player	School	Position	Class	Reference
1960–61	Jerry Lucas	Ohio State	F / C	Junior	
1961–62	Jerry Lucas (2)	Ohio State	F / C	Senior	
1962–63	Art Heyman	Duke	G / F	Senior	
1963–64	Gary Bradds	Ohio State	F	Senior	
1964–65	Bill Bradley	Princeton	SF / SG	Senior	
1965–66	Cazzie Russell	Michigan	SG	Senior	
1966–67	Lew Alcindor^{[a]}	UCLA	C	Sophomore	
1967–68	Elvin Hayes	Houston	C	Senior	
1968–69	Lew Alcindor^{[a]}	UCLA	C	Senior	
1969–70	Pete Maravich	LSU	PG	Senior	
1970–71	Austin Carr	Notre Dame	SG	Senior	
1971–72	Bill Walton	UCLA	C	Sophomore	
1972–73	Bill Walton (2)	UCLA	C	Junior	
1973–74	David Thompson	NC State	SG / SF	Junior	
1974–75	David Thompson (2)	NC State	SG / SF	Senior	
1975–76	Scott May	Indiana	SF	Senior	
1976–77	Marques Johnson	UCLA	G / F	Senior	
1977–78	Butch Lee	Marquette	PG	Senior	
1978–79	Larry Bird	Indiana State	SF	Senior	
1979–80	Mark Aguirre	DePaul	SF	Sophomore	
1980–81	Ralph Sampson	Virginia	C	Sophomore	
1981–82	Ralph Sampson (2)	Virginia	C	Junior	
1982–83	Ralph Sampson (3)	Virginia	C	Senior	
1983–84	Michael Jordan	North Carolina	SG	Junior	
1984–85	Patrick Ewing	Georgetown	C	Senior	
1985–86	Walter Berry	St. John's	PF	Senior	
1986–87	David Robinson	Navy	C	Senior	
1987–88	Hersey Hawkins	Bradley	SG	Senior	
1988–89	Sean Elliott	Arizona	SF	Senior	
1989–90	Lionel Simmons	La Salle	SF	Senior	
1990–91	Shaquille O'Neal	LSU	C	Sophomore	
1991–92	Christian Laettner	Duke	PF / C	Senior	
1992–93	Calbert Cheaney	Indiana	SF	Senior	
1993–94	Glenn Robinson	Purdue	SF	Junior	
1994–95	Joe Smith	Maryland	PF	Sophomore	
1995–96	Marcus Camby	UMass	C	Junior	
1996–97	Tim Duncan	Wake Forest	C	Senior	
1997–98	Antawn Jamison	North Carolina	SF	Junior	
1998–99	Elton Brand	Duke	C	Sophomore	
1999–00	Kenyon Martin	Cincinnati	PF	Senior	
2000–01	Shane Battier	Duke	SF / SG	Senior	
2001–02	Jason Williams	Duke	PG	Junior	
2002–03	David West	Xavier	PF	Senior	
2003–04	Jameer Nelson	Saint Joseph's	PG	Senior	
2004–05	Andrew Bogut	Utah	C	Sophomore	
2005–06	JJ Redick	Duke	SG	Senior	
2006–07	Kevin Durant	Texas	SF	Freshman	
2007–08	Tyler Hansbrough	North Carolina	PF	Junior	
2008–09	Blake Griffin	Oklahoma	PF	Sophomore	
2009–10	Evan Turner	Ohio State	SG	Junior	
2010–11	Jimmer Fredette	BYU	SG	Senior	
2011–12	Anthony Davis	Kentucky	C	Freshman	
2012–13	Trey Burke	Michigan	PG	Sophomore	
2013–14	Doug McDermott	Creighton	SF	Senior	
2014–15	Frank Kaminsky	Wisconsin	PF	Senior	
2015–16	Denzel Valentine	Michigan State	SG	Senior	
2016–17	Frank Mason III	Kansas	PG	Senior	
2017–18	Jalen Brunson	Villanova	PG	Junior	
2018–19	Zion Williamson	Duke	PF	Freshman	
2019–20	Obi Toppin	Dayton	PF	Sophomore	
2020–21	Luka Garza	Iowa	C	Senior	
2021–22	Oscar Tshiebwe	Kentucky	C	Junior	
2022–23	Zach Edey	Purdue	C	Junior	
2023–24	Zach Edey (2)	Purdue	C	Senior	
2024–25	Cooper Flagg	Duke	SG / SF	Freshman	
2025–26	Cameron Boozer	Duke	PF	Freshman	

Women
Season	Player	School	Position	Class	Reference
1960–61	No award				
1961–62	No award				
1962–63	No award				
1963–64	No award				
1964–65	No award				
1965–66	No award				
1966–67	No award				
1967–68	No award				
1968–69	No award				
1969–70	No award				
1970–71	No award				
1971–72	No award				
1972–73	No award				
1973–74	No award				
1974–75	No award				
1975–76	No award				
1976–77	No award				
1977–78	No award				
1978–79	No award				
1979–80	No award				
1980–81	No award				
1981–82	No award				
1982–83	No award				
1983–84	No award				
1984–85	No award				
1985–86	No award				
1986–87	No award				
1987–88	No award				
1988–89	No award				
1989–90	No award				
1990–91	No award				
1991–92	No award				
1992–93	No award				
1993–94	No award				
1994–95	Rebecca Lobo	UConn	C	Senior	
1995–96	Jennifer Rizzotti	UConn	PG	Senior	
1996–97	Kara Wolters	UConn	C	Senior	
1997–98	Chamique Holdsclaw	Tennessee	SF	Junior	
1998–99	Chamique Holdsclaw (2)	Tennessee	SF	Senior	
1999–00	Tamika Catchings	Tennessee	SF	Junior	
2000–01	Ruth Riley	Notre Dame	C	Senior	
2001–02	Sue Bird	UConn	PG	Senior	
2002–03	Diana Taurasi	UConn	PG / SG	Junior	
2003–04	Alana Beard	Duke	SG / SF	Senior	
2004–05	Seimone Augustus	LSU	SG / SF	Junior	
2005–06	Seimone Augustus (2)	LSU	SG / SF	Senior	
2006–07	Courtney Paris	Oklahoma	C	Sophomore	
2007–08	Candace Parker	Tennessee	PF	Senior	
2008–09	Maya Moore	UConn	PF	Sophomore	
2009–10	Tina Charles	UConn	C	Senior	
2010–11	Maya Moore (2)	UConn	PF	Senior	
2011–12	Brittney Griner	Baylor	C	Junior	
2012–13	Brittney Griner (2)	Baylor	C	Senior	
2013–14	Breanna Stewart	UConn	PF	Sophomore	
2014–15	Breanna Stewart (2)	UConn	PF	Junior	
2015–16	Breanna Stewart (3)	UConn	PF	Senior	
2016–17	Kelsey Plum	Washington	PG	Senior	
2017–18	A'ja Wilson	South Carolina	C	Senior	
2018–19	Megan Gustafson	Iowa	C	Senior	
2019–20	Sabrina Ionescu	Oregon	PG	Senior	
2020–21	Paige Bueckers	UConn	PG	Freshman	
2021–22	Aliyah Boston	South Carolina	PF / C	Junior	
2022–23	Caitlin Clark	Iowa	PG	Junior	
2023–24	Caitlin Clark (2)	Iowa	PG	Senior	
2024–25	JuJu Watkins	USC	SG	Sophomore	
2025–26	Sarah Strong	UConn	PF	Sophomore	

- ^{a} Lew Alcindor changed his name to Kareem Abdul-Jabbar in 1971 after converting to Islam.

== See also ==
- AP College Basketball Coach of the Year
- List of U.S. men's college basketball national player of the year awards
