= Oscar Robertson Trophy =

Award for best college basketball player

- Awarded for: the most outstanding NCAA Division I men's basketball player
- Country: United States
- Presented by: USBWA

History
- First award: 1959
- Most recent: Cameron Boozer, Duke
- Website: Official website

The Oscar Robertson Trophy is given out annually to the most outstanding NCAA Division I men's basketball player by the U.S. Basketball Writers Association (USBWA), first presented in 1959. It is one of the oldest national player of the year awards in college basketball, behind only The Sporting News' award (1943), the Helms award (1944)^{[a]}, and the UPI award (1955). The original name was the USBWA College Player of the Year, but the men's player of the year award has been called the Oscar Robertson Trophy since 1998. It was renamed to honor the college and professional legend, and first-ever recipient, Oscar Robertson. Five nominees are presented and the individual with the most votes receives the award during the NCAA tournament.

== Key ==
†	Co-Players of the Year
Player (X)	Denotes the number of times the player has been awarded the Oscar Robertson Trophy at that point

== Winners ==
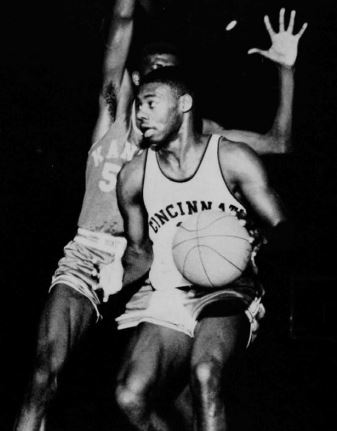
Oscar Robertson, Cincinnati, 1959 and 1960

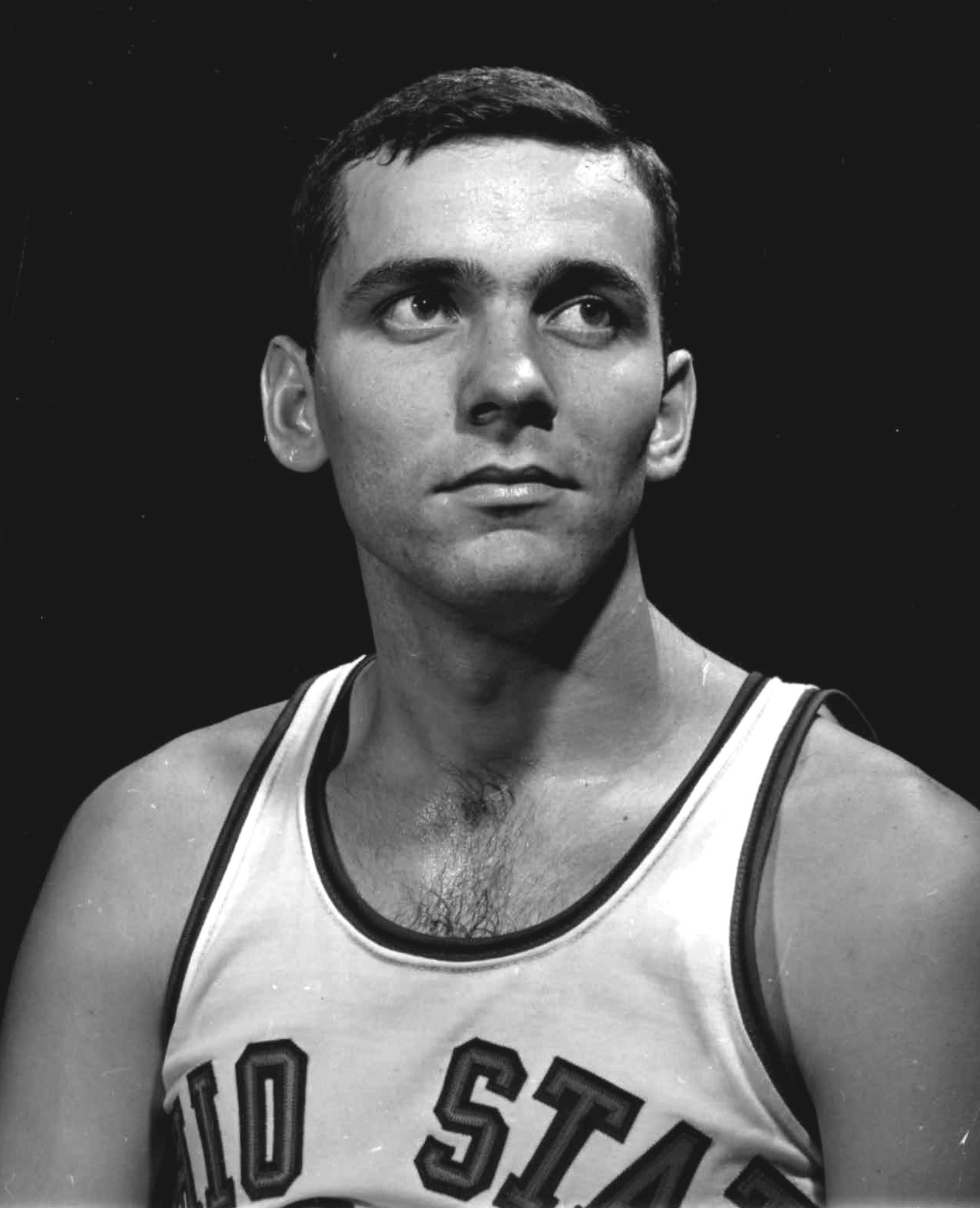
Jerry Lucas, Ohio State, 1961 and 1962

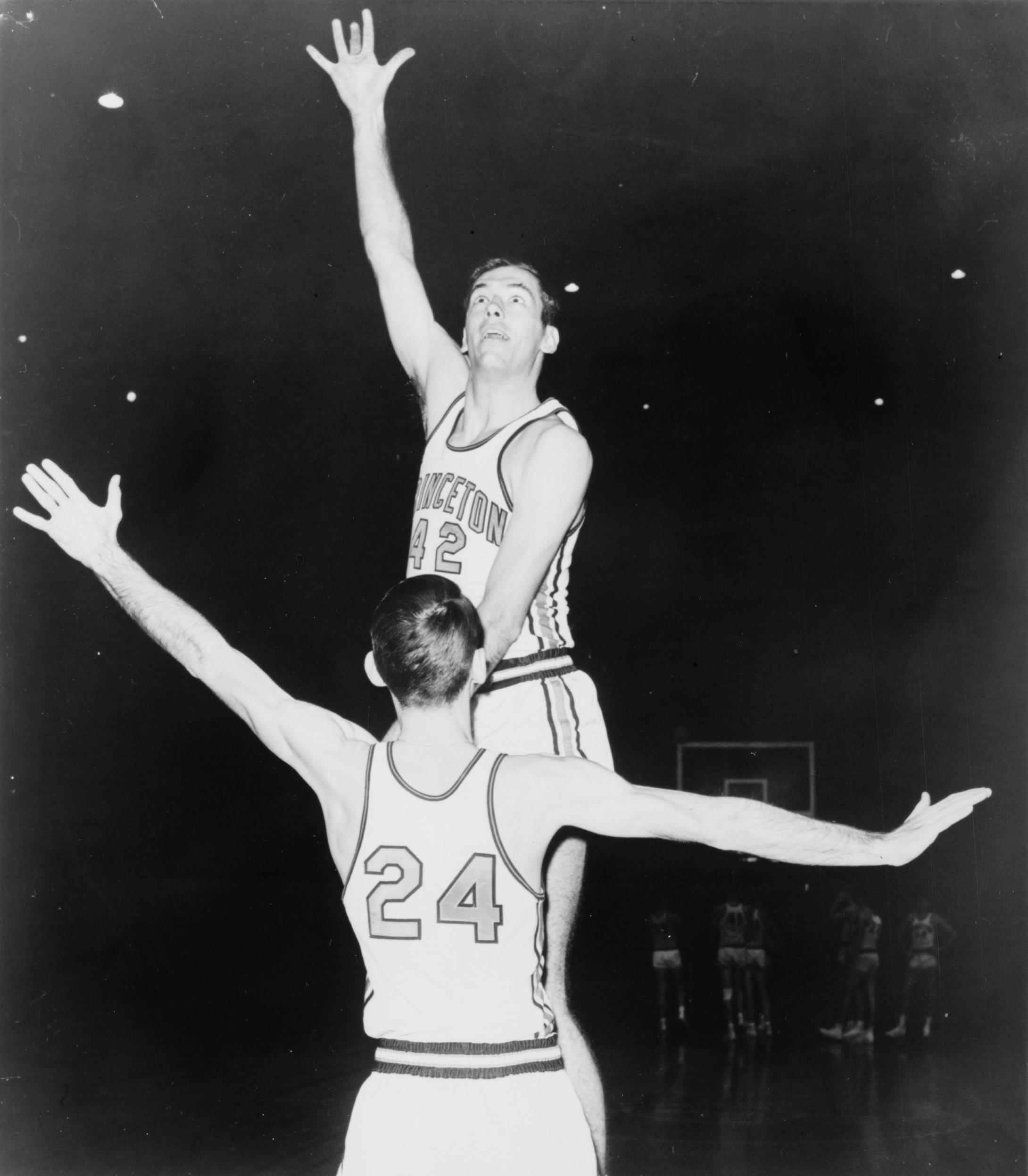
Bill Bradley, Princeton, 1965

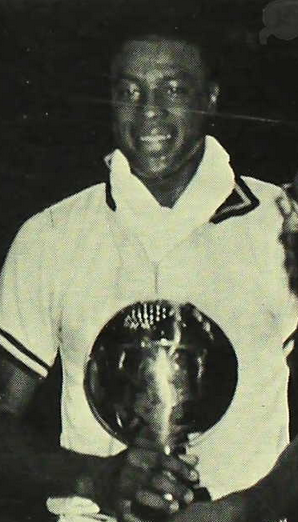
Cazzie Russell, Michigan, 1966

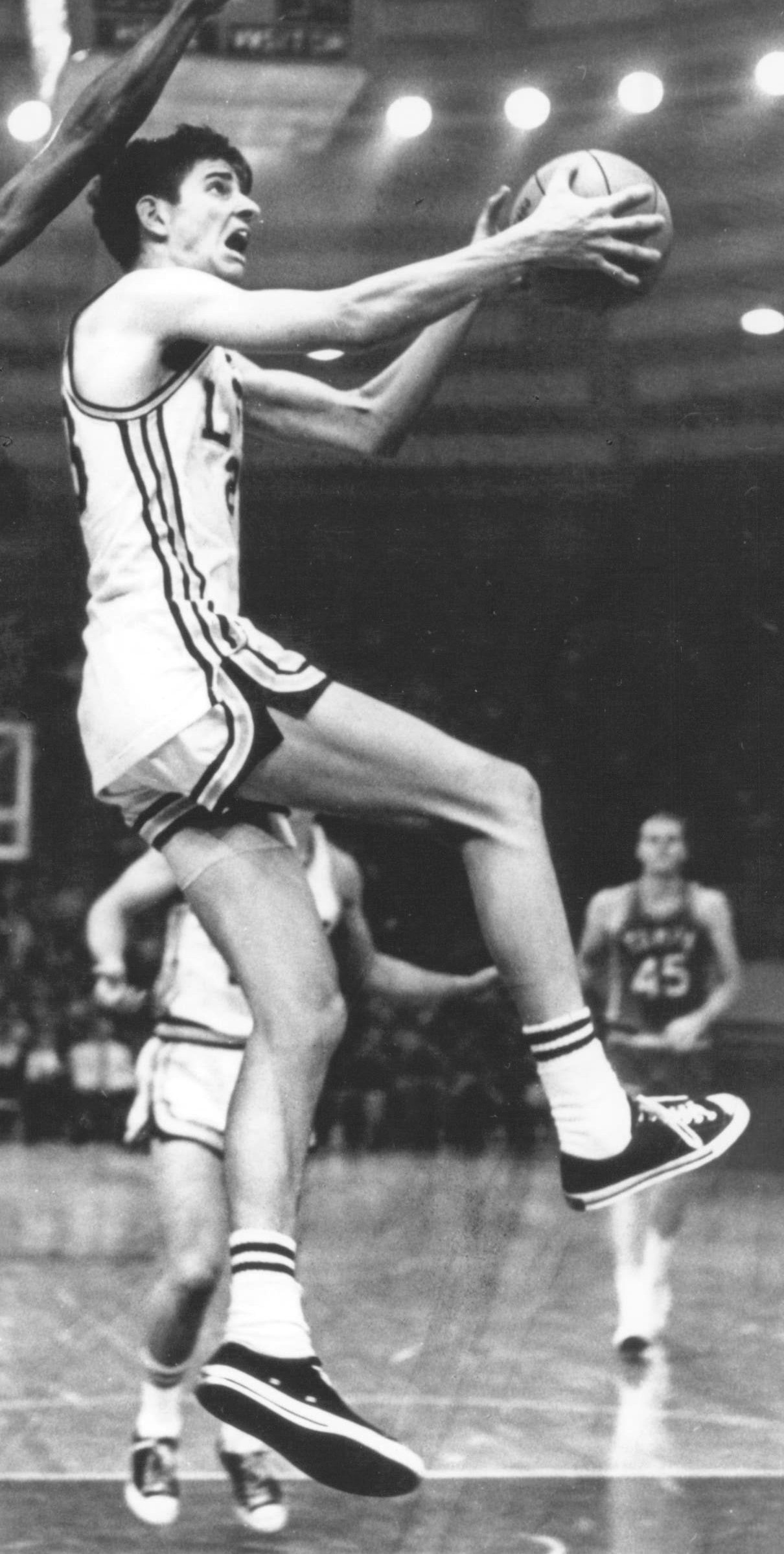
Pete Maravich, LSU, 1969 and 1970

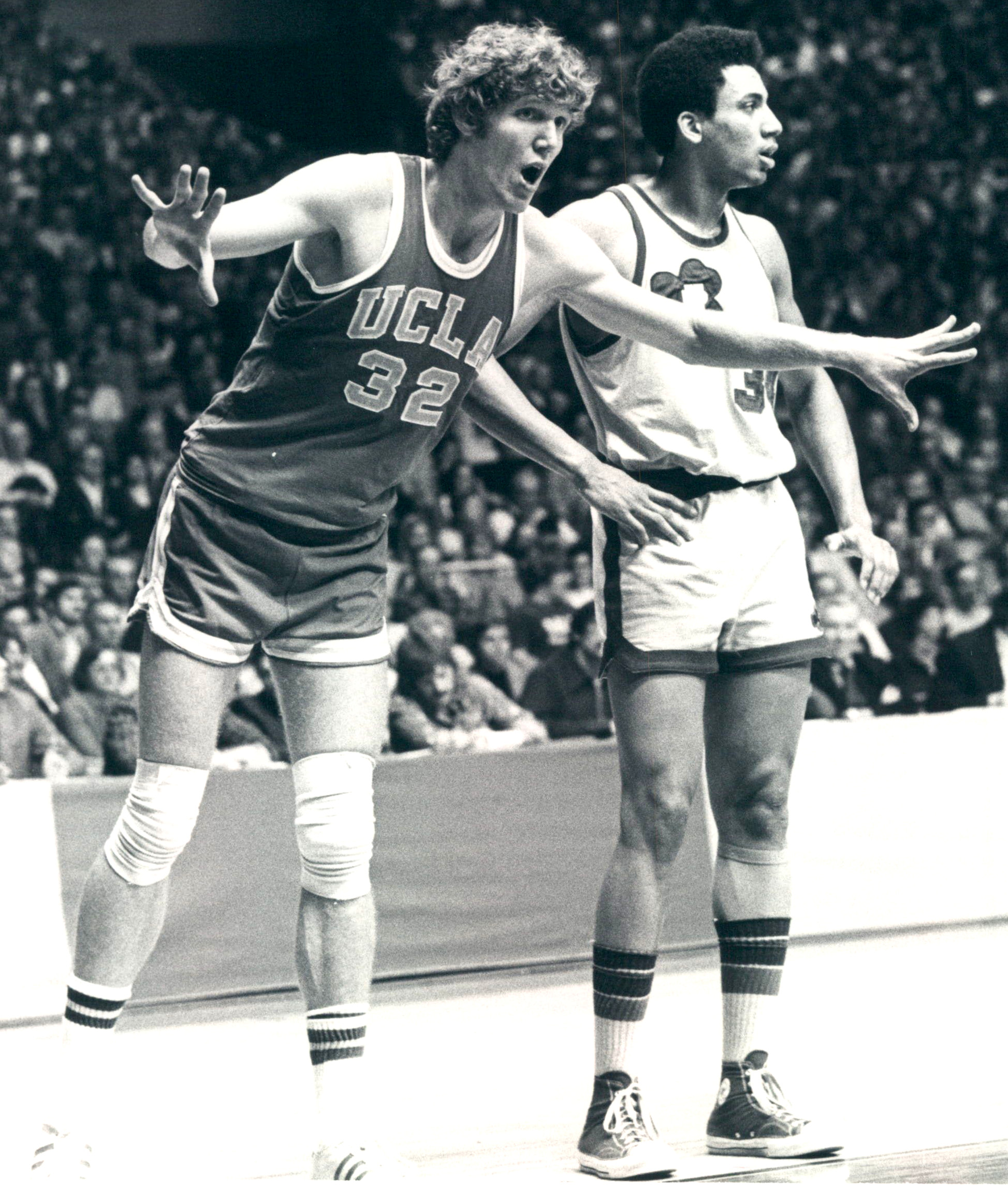
Bill Walton, UCLA, 1972 through 1974

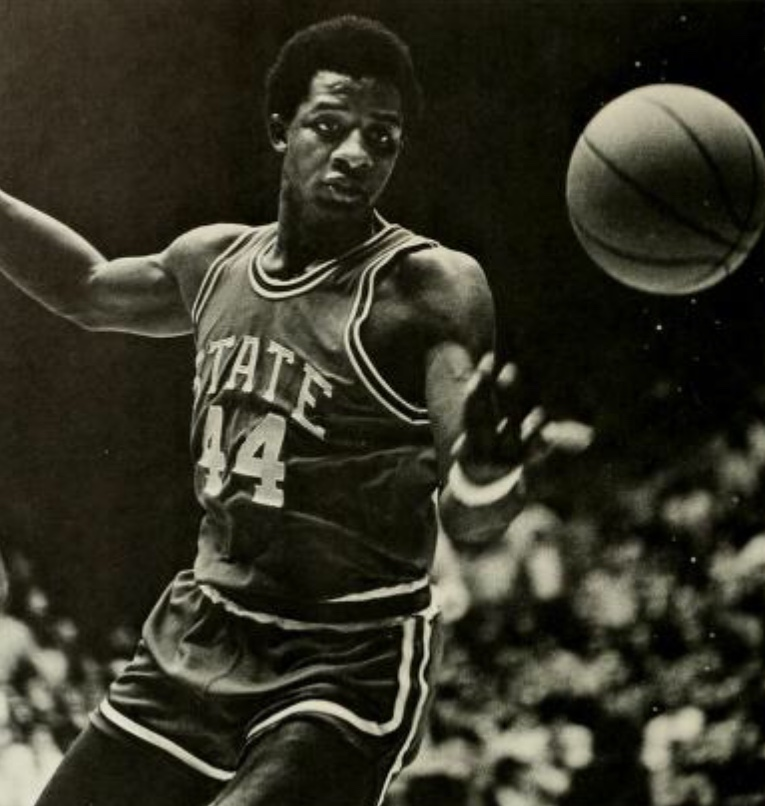
David Thompson, NC State, 1975

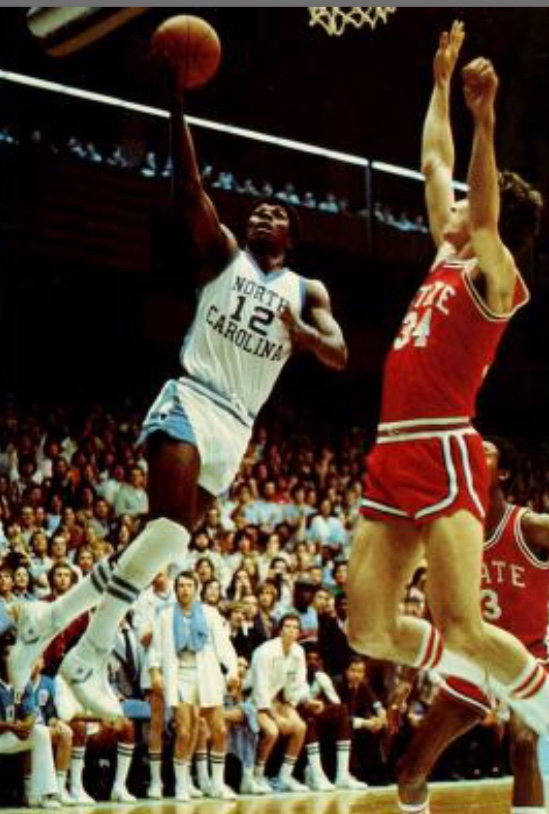
Phil Ford, North Carolina, 1978

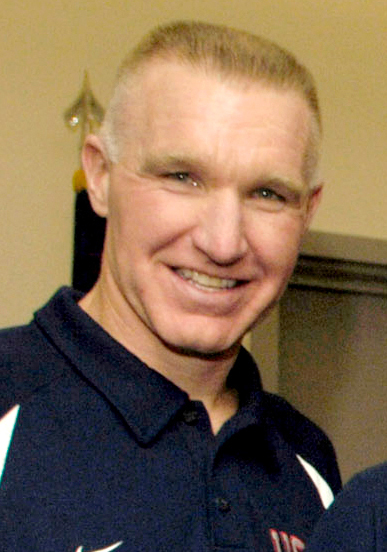
Chris Mullin, St. John's, 1985

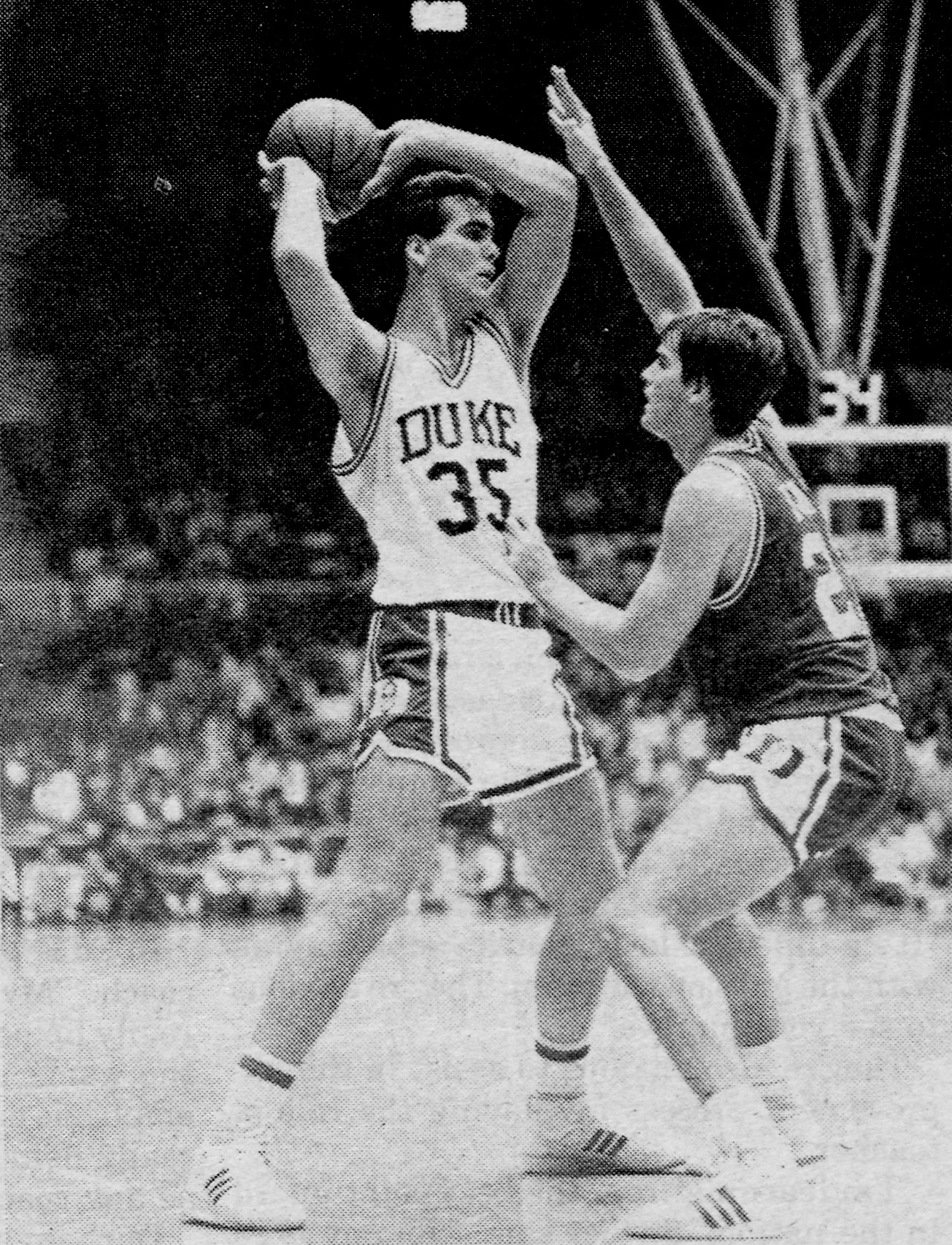
Danny Ferry, Duke, 1989

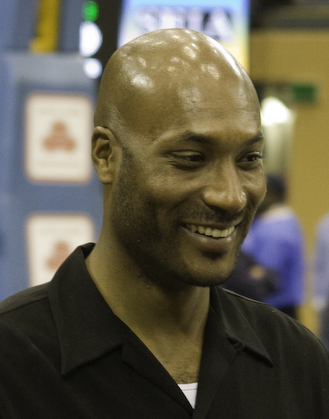
Ed O'Bannon, UCLA, 1995

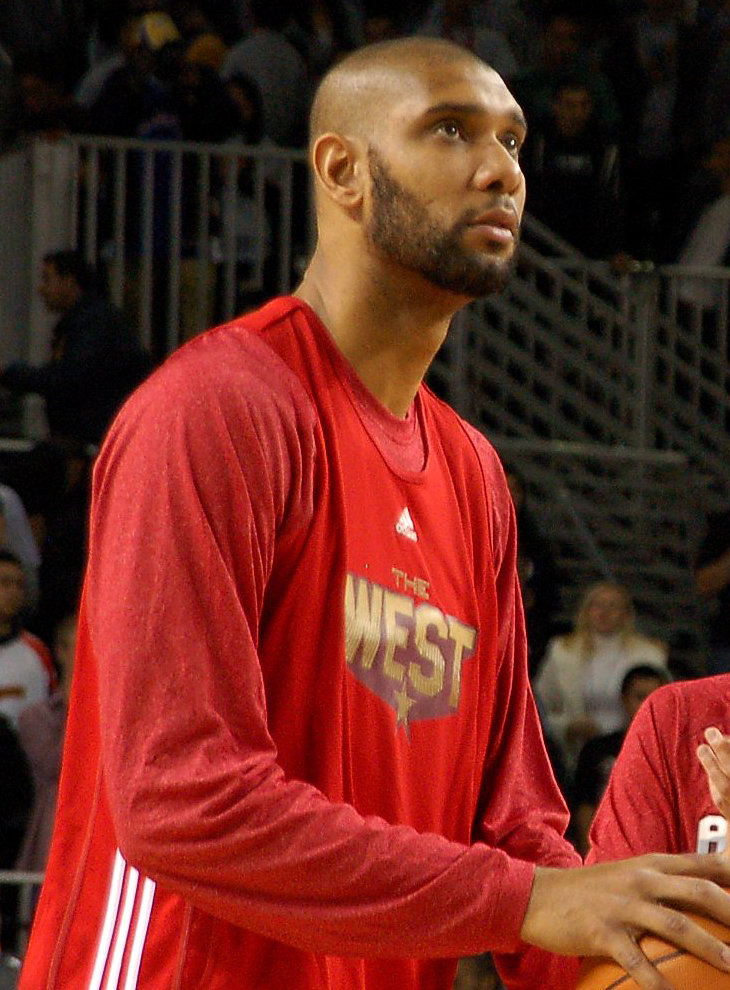
Tim Duncan, Wake Forest, 1997

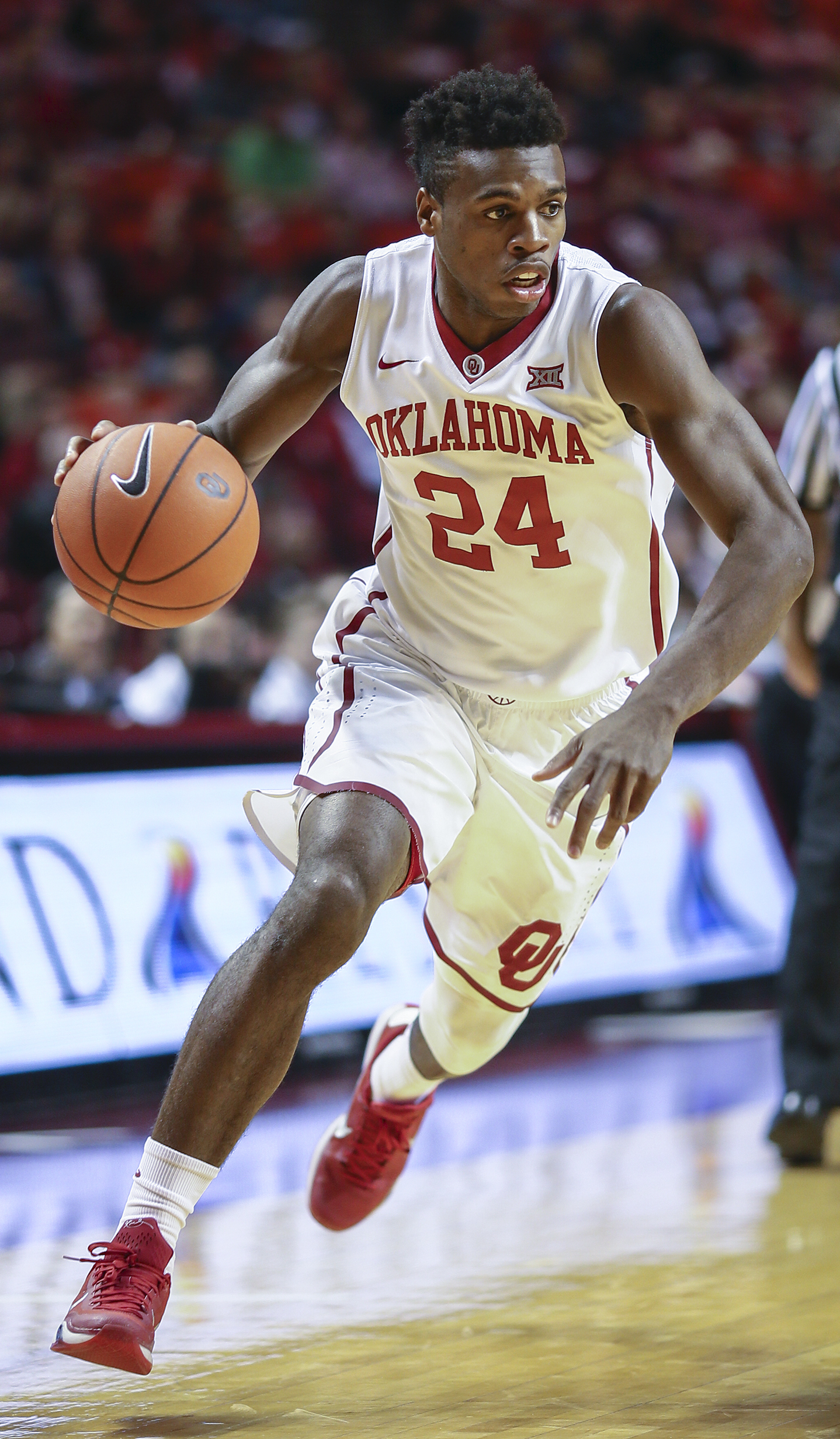
Buddy Hield, Oklahoma, 2016

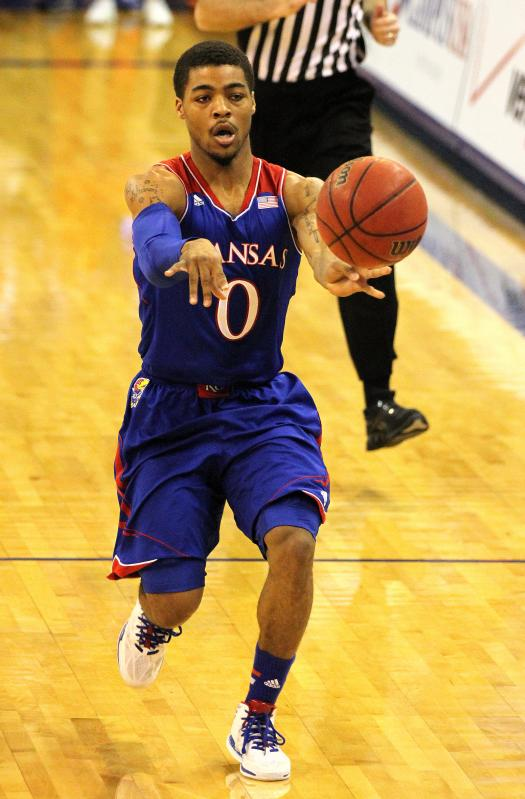
Frank Mason III, Kansas, 2017

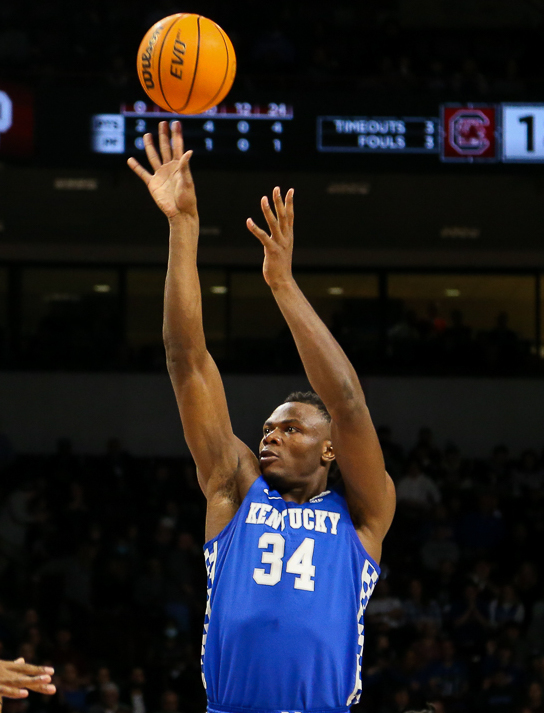
Oscar Tshiebwe, Kentucky, 2022

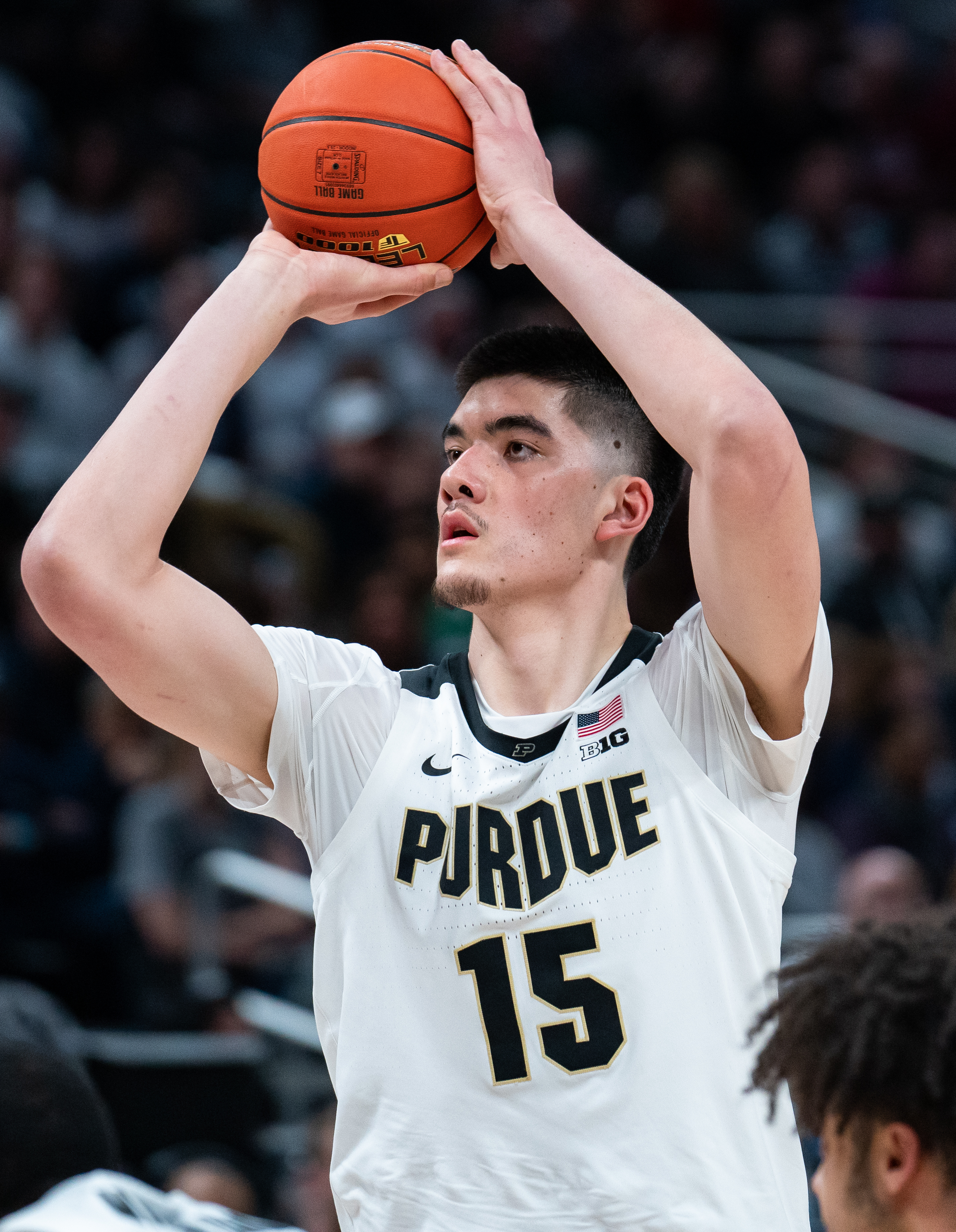
Zach Edey, Purdue, 2023 and 2024

Season	Player	School	Position	Class	Reference
1958–59	Oscar Robertson	Cincinnati	PG	Junior	
1959–60	Oscar Robertson (2)	Cincinnati	PG	Senior	
1960–61	Jerry Lucas	Ohio State	F / C	Junior	
1961–62	Jerry Lucas (2)	Ohio State	F / C	Senior	
1962–63	Art Heyman	Duke	G / F	Senior	
1963–64	Walt Hazzard	UCLA	SG / PG	Senior	
1964–65	Bill Bradley	Princeton	SF / SG	Senior	
1965–66	Cazzie Russell	Michigan	SG	Senior	
1966–67	Lew Alcindor^{[b]}	UCLA	C	Sophomore	
1967–68	Lew Alcindor^{[b]} (2)	UCLA	C	Junior	
1968–69	Pete Maravich	LSU	PG	Junior	
1969–70	Pete Maravich (2)	LSU	PG	Senior	
1970–71	Sidney Wicks	UCLA	PF	Senior	
1971–72	Bill Walton	UCLA	C	Sophomore	
1972–73	Bill Walton (2)	UCLA	C	Junior	
1973–74	Bill Walton (3)	UCLA	C	Senior	
1974–75	David Thompson	NC State	SG / SF	Senior	
1975–76	Adrian Dantley	Notre Dame	SF	Junior	
1976–77	Marques Johnson	UCLA	G / F	Senior	
1977–78	Phil Ford	North Carolina	PG	Senior	
1978–79	Larry Bird	Indiana State	SF	Senior	
1979–80	Mark Aguirre	DePaul	SF	Sophomore	
1980–81	Ralph Sampson	Virginia	C	Sophomore	
1981–82	Ralph Sampson (2)	Virginia	C	Junior	
1982–83	Ralph Sampson (3)	Virginia	C	Senior	
1983–84	Michael Jordan	North Carolina	SG	Junior	
1984–85	Chris Mullin	St. John's	SF / SG	Senior	
1985–86	Walter Berry	St. John's	PF	Senior	
1986–87	David Robinson	Navy	C	Senior	
1987–88	Hersey Hawkins	Bradley	SG	Senior	
1988–89	Danny Ferry	Duke	PF / C	Senior	
1989–90	Lionel Simmons	La Salle	SF	Senior	
1990–91	Larry Johnson	UNLV	PF	Senior	
1991–92	Christian Laettner	Duke	PF / C	Senior	
1992–93	Calbert Cheaney	Indiana	SF	Senior	
1993–94	Glenn Robinson	Purdue	SF	Junior	
1994–95	Ed O'Bannon	UCLA	PF	Senior	
1995–96	Marcus Camby	UMass	C	Junior	
1996–97	Tim Duncan	Wake Forest	C	Senior	
1997–98	Antawn Jamison	North Carolina	SF	Junior	
1998–99	Elton Brand	Duke	C	Sophomore	
1999–00	Kenyon Martin	Cincinnati	PF	Senior	
2000–01	Shane Battier	Duke	SF / SG	Senior	
2001–02	Jason Williams	Duke	PG	Junior	
2002–03	David West	Xavier	PF	Senior	
2003–04	Jameer Nelson	Saint Joseph's	PG	Senior	
2004–05	Andrew Bogut	Utah	C	Sophomore	
2005–06^{†}	Adam Morrison	Gonzaga	SF	Junior	
2005–06^{†}	JJ Redick	Duke	SG	Senior	
2006–07	Kevin Durant	Texas	SF	Freshman	
2007–08	Tyler Hansbrough	North Carolina	PF	Junior	
2008–09	Blake Griffin	Oklahoma	PF	Sophomore	
2009–10	Evan Turner	Ohio State	SG	Junior	
2010–11	Jimmer Fredette	BYU	SG	Senior	
2011–12	Anthony Davis	Kentucky	C	Freshman	
2012–13	Trey Burke	Michigan	PG	Sophomore	
2013–14	Doug McDermott	Creighton	SF	Senior	
2014–15	Frank Kaminsky	Wisconsin	PF	Senior	
2015–16	Buddy Hield	Oklahoma	SG	Senior	
2016–17	Frank Mason III	Kansas	PG	Senior	
2017–18	Jalen Brunson	Villanova	PG	Junior	
2018–19	Zion Williamson	Duke	PF	Freshman	
2019–20	Obi Toppin	Dayton	PF	Sophomore	
2020–21	Luka Garza	Iowa	C	Senior	
2021–22	Oscar Tshiebwe	Kentucky	C	Junior	
2022–23	Zach Edey	Purdue	C	Junior	
2023–24	Zach Edey (2)	Purdue	C	Senior	
2024–25	Cooper Flagg	Duke	SG / SF	Freshman	
2025–26	Cameron Boozer	Duke	PF	Freshman	

- ^{a} The Helms Foundation Player of the Year was first presented in 1944, when the Helms Athletic Foundation announced organization founder Bill Schroeder's player of the year selection for the 1943–44 season as well as his retroactive picks for each season from 1904–05 to 1942–43. Since all awards from 1905 through 1943 were retroactive, the Oscar Robertson Trophy is only 15 years behind it as a major national player of the year award, not 54 years.
- ^{b} Lew Alcindor changed his name to Kareem Abdul-Jabbar in 1971 after converting to Islam.

== See also ==
- List of U.S. men's college basketball national player of the year awards
- USBWA National Freshman of the Year
- USBWA Women's National Player of the Year
- USBWA Most Courageous Award – presented to figures associated with college basketball who have "demonstrated extraordinary courage reflecting honor on the sport of amateur basketball"
