= UPI College Basketball Player of the Year =

US college sports award

- Awarded for: the most outstanding NCAA Division I men's basketball player
- Country: United States
- Presented by: United Press International

History
- First award: 1955
- Final award: 1996

The UPI College Basketball Player of the Year was an annual basketball award given to the best men's basketball player in NCAA Division I competition. The award was first given following the 1954–55 season and was discontinued following the 1995–96 season. It was given by United Press International (UPI), a news agency in the United States that rivaled the Associated Press but began to decline with the advent of television news.

Five players—Oscar Robertson, Jerry Lucas, Lew Alcindor^{[a]}, Bill Walton and Ralph Sampson—won the award multiple times. Among them, only Robertson, Walton, and Sampson were three-time UPI Players of the Year.

UCLA had the most all-time winners with six. Ohio State was second with four winners, while Cincinnati and Virginia were tied for third with three winners apiece.

== Key ==
Player (X)	Denotes the number of times the player has been awarded the UPI Player of the Year award at that point

== Winners ==
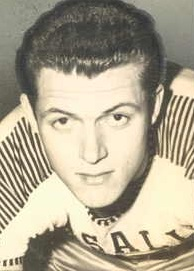
Tom Gola, La Salle, 1955

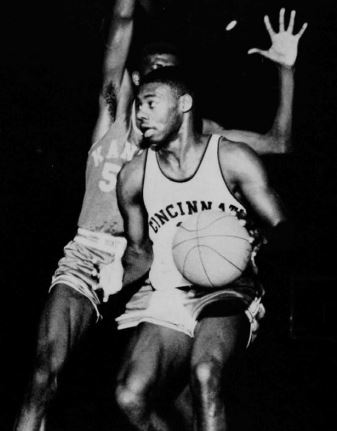
Oscar Robertson, Cincinnati, 1958 through 1960

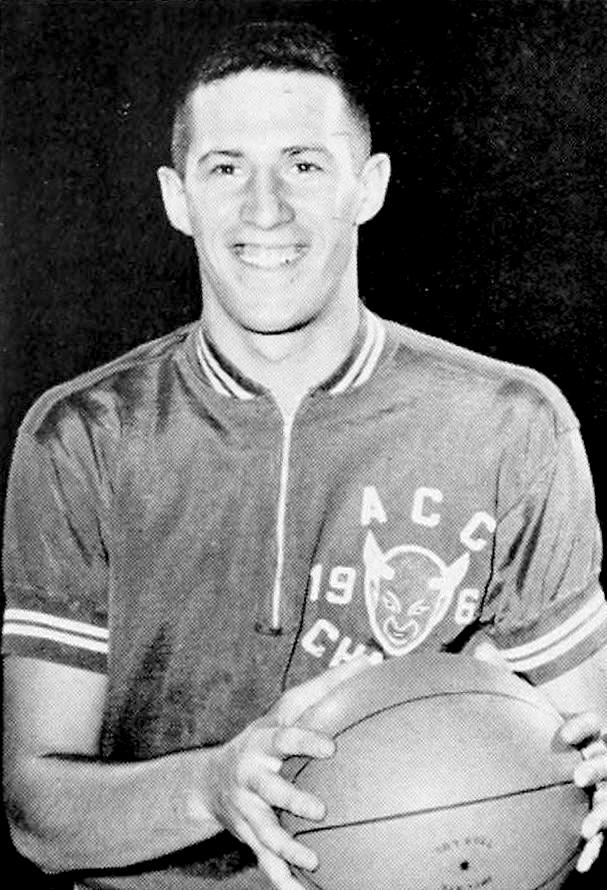
Art Heyman, Duke, 1963

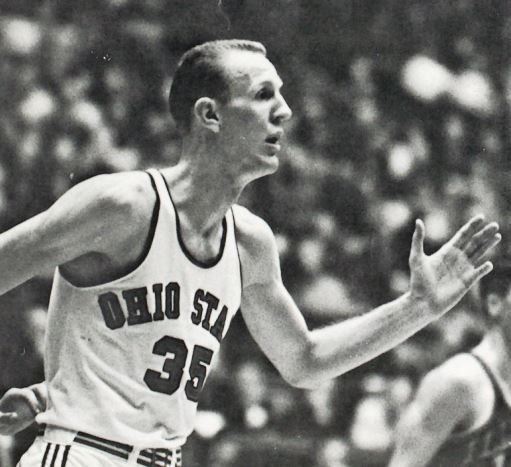
Gary Bradds, Ohio State, 1964

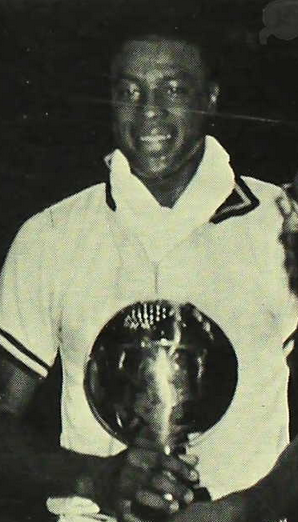
Cazzie Russell, Michigan, 1966

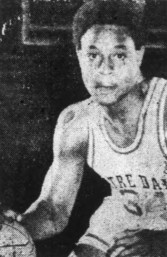
Austin Carr, Notre Dame, 1971

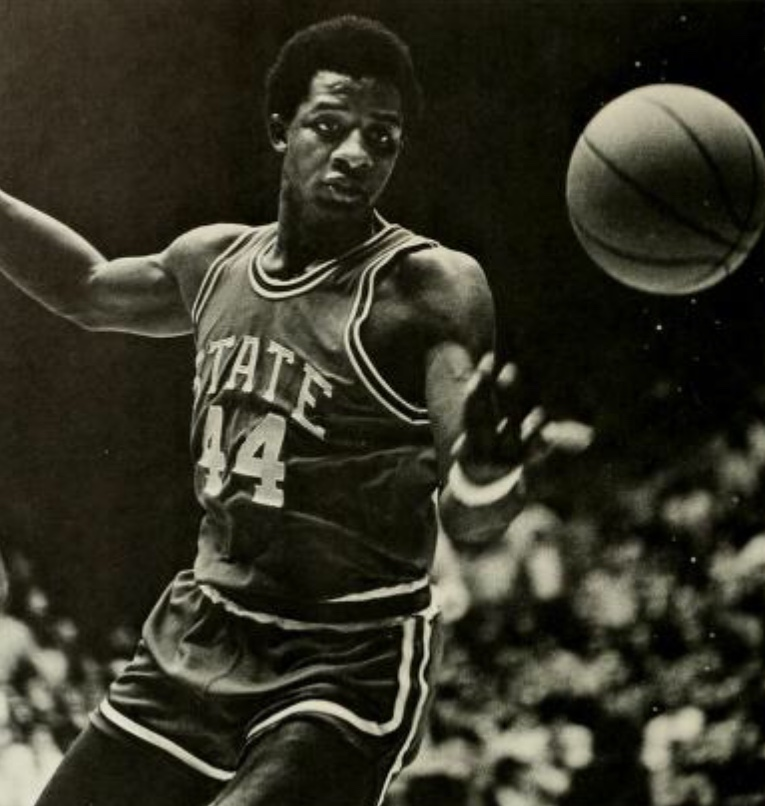
David Thompson, NC State, 1975

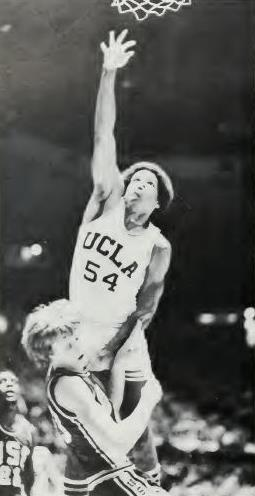
Marques Johnson, UCLA, 1977

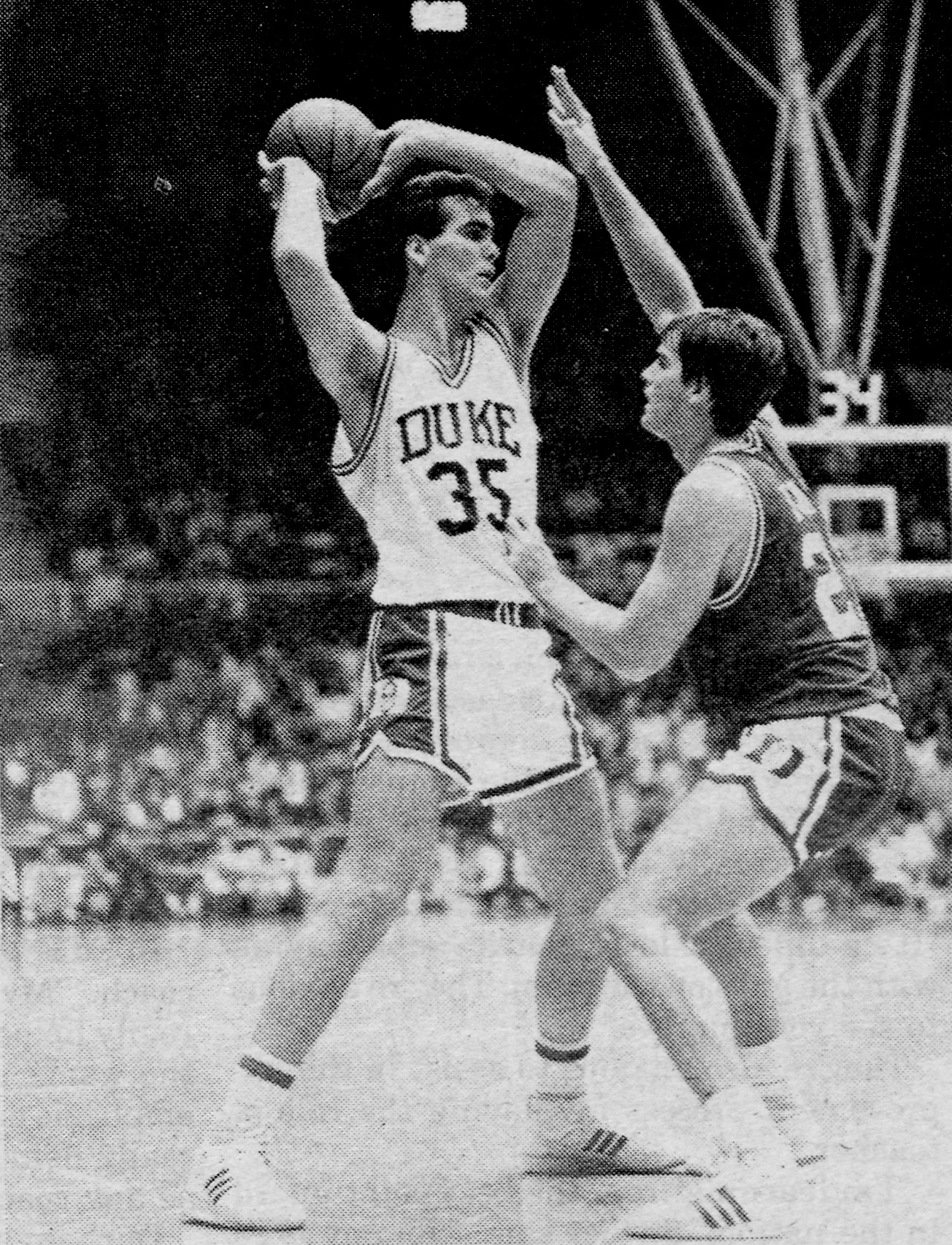
Danny Ferry, Duke, 1989

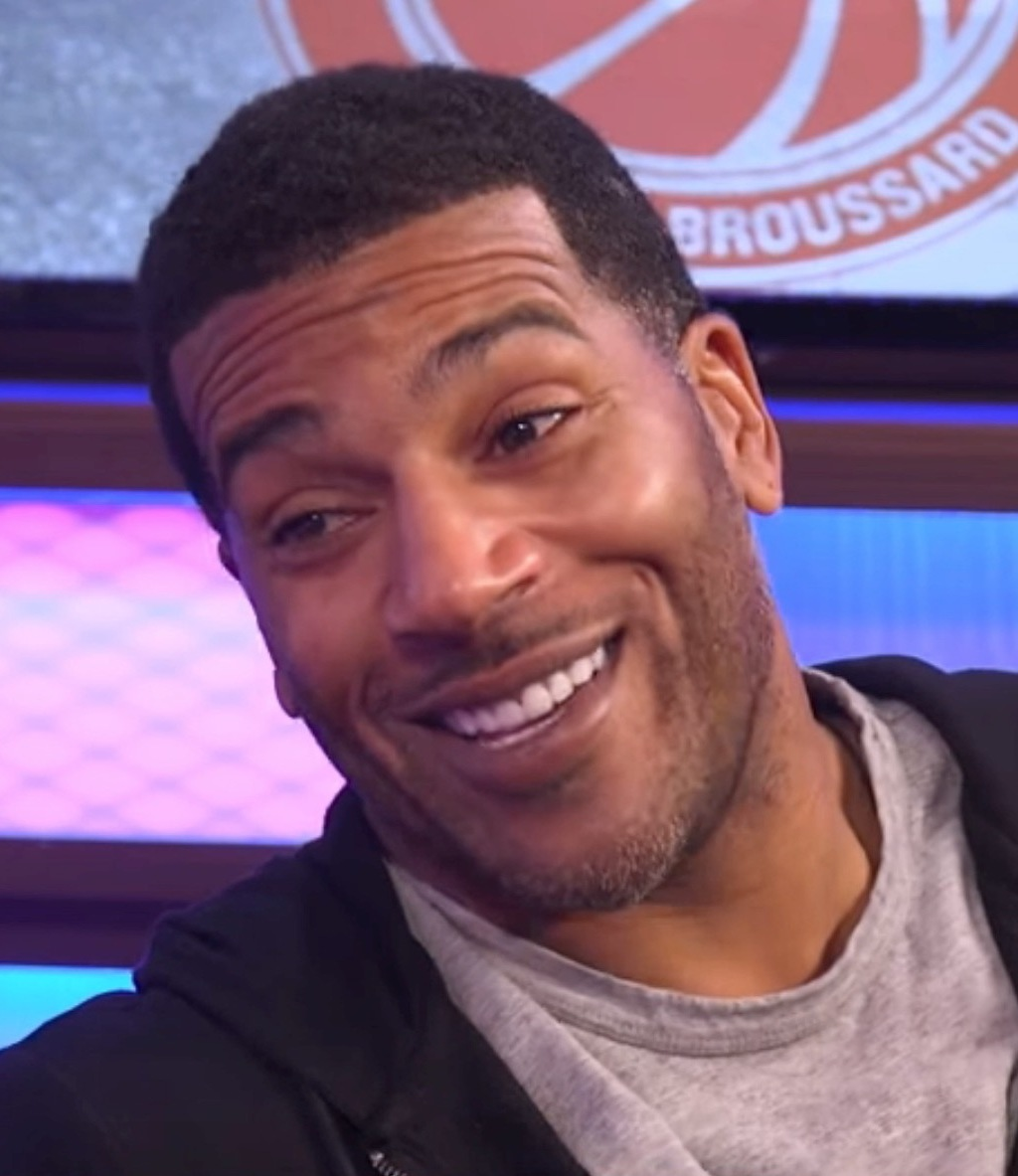
Jim Jackson, Ohio State, 1992

Season	Player	School	Position	Class	Reference
1954–55	Tom Gola	La Salle	F	Senior	
1955–56	Bill Russell	San Francisco	C	Senior	
1956–57	Chet Forte	Columbia	PG	Senior	
1957–58	Oscar Robertson	Cincinnati	PG	Sophomore	
1958–59	Oscar Robertson (2)	Cincinnati	PG	Junior	
1959–60	Oscar Robertson (3)	Cincinnati	PG	Senior	
1960–61	Jerry Lucas	Ohio State	F / C	Junior	
1961–62	Jerry Lucas (2)	Ohio State	F / C	Senior	
1962–63	Art Heyman	Duke	G / F	Senior	
1963–64	Gary Bradds	Ohio State	F	Senior	
1964–65	Bill Bradley	Princeton	SF / SG	Senior	
1965–66	Cazzie Russell	Michigan	SG	Senior	
1966–67	Lew Alcindor^{[a]}	UCLA	C	Sophomore	
1967–68	Elvin Hayes	Houston	F / C	Senior	
1968–69	Lew Alcindor^{[a]} (2)	UCLA	C	Senior	
1969–70	Pete Maravich	LSU	G	Senior	
1970–71	Austin Carr	Notre Dame	G	Senior	
1971–72	Bill Walton	UCLA	C	Sophomore	
1972–73	Bill Walton (2)	UCLA	C	Junior	
1973–74	Bill Walton (3)	UCLA	C	Senior	
1974–75	David Thompson	NC State	SG / SF	Senior	
1975–76	Scott May	Indiana	F	Senior	
1976–77	Marques Johnson	UCLA	G / F	Senior	
1977–78	Butch Lee	Marquette	PG	Senior	
1978–79	Larry Bird	Indiana State	SF	Senior	
1979–80	Mark Aguirre	DePaul	SF	Sophomore	
1980–81	Ralph Sampson	Virginia	C	Sophomore	
1981–82	Ralph Sampson (2)	Virginia	C	Junior	
1982–83	Ralph Sampson (3)	Virginia	C	Senior	
1983–84	Michael Jordan	North Carolina	SG	Junior	
1984–85	Chris Mullin	St. John's	SF / SG	Senior	
1985–86	Walter Berry	St. John's	PF	Senior	
1986–87	David Robinson	Navy	C	Senior	
1987–88	Hersey Hawkins	Bradley	SG	Senior	
1988–89	Danny Ferry	Duke	PF / C	Senior	
1989–90	Lionel Simmons	La Salle	SF	Senior	
1990–91	Shaquille O'Neal	LSU	C	Sophomore	
1991–92	Jim Jackson	Ohio State	SG	Junior	
1992–93	Calbert Cheaney	Indiana	SF	Senior	
1993–94	Glenn Robinson	Purdue	SF / PF	Junior	
1994–95	Joe Smith	Maryland	C	Sophomore	
1995–96	Ray Allen	UConn	SG	Junior	

- ^{a} Lew Alcindor changed his name to Kareem Abdul-Jabbar in 1971 after converting to Islam.
