= 1962–63 Duke Blue Devils men's basketball team =

American college basketball season

1962–63 Duke Blue Devils men's basketball

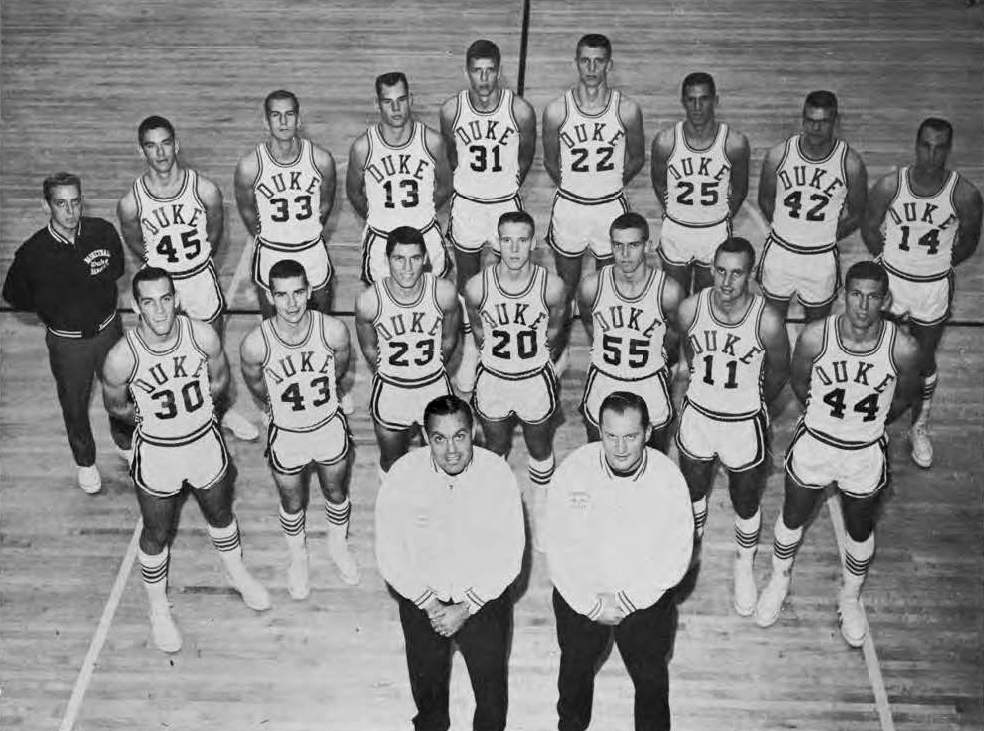

ACC regular season champions ACC tournament champions

NCAA Division I men's tournament, third place
- Conference: Atlantic Coast Conference

Ranking
- Coaches: No. 2
- AP: No. 2
- Record: 27–3 (14–0 ACC)
- Head coach: Vic Bubas
- Assistant coaches: Bucky Waters; Fred Shabel
- Home arena: Cameron Indoor Stadium

1962–63 ACC men's basketball standings
	Conf.				Overall
Team	W		L	PCT	W		L	PCT
No. 2 Duke †	14	–	0	1.000	27	–	3	.900
Wake Forest	11	–	3	.786	16	–	10	.615
North Carolina	10	–	4	.714	15	–	6	.714
Clemson	5	–	9	.357	12	–	13	.480
NC State	5	–	9	.357	10	–	11	.476
South Carolina	4	–	10	.286	9	–	15	.375
Maryland	4	–	10	.286	8	–	13	.381
Virginia	3	–	11	.214	5	–	20	.200
† 1963 ACC tournament winner Rankings from AP Poll

The 1962–63 Duke Blue Devils men's basketball team represented Duke University. The head coach was Vic Bubas. The team played its home games in the Cameron Indoor Stadium in Durham, North Carolina, and was a member of the Atlantic Coast Conference.

== Roster ==
1962–63 Duke Blue Devils men's basketball team
Players
Coaches

Pos.	#	Name	Height	Weight	Year	Hometown
C	22	Jay Buckley	6 ft 10 in (2.08 m)	215 lb (98 kg)	Jr	Cheverly, Md.
C	42	Fred Cox	6 ft 3 in (1.91 m)	—
G	23	Ray Cox	6 ft 0 in (1.83 m)	165 lb (75 kg)	Jr	Durham, N.C.
G	20	Denny Ferguson	6 ft 0 in (1.83 m)	170 lb (77 kg)	So	Springdale, Pa.
G	55	Ron Herbster	6 ft 2 in (1.88 m)	178 lb (81 kg)	So	Chester, Mass.
F	25	Art Heyman	6 ft 5 in (1.96 m)	205 lb (93 kg)	Sr	New York City, Ny.
G	30	Buzzy Harrison	6 ft 3 in (1.91 m)	180 lb (82 kg)	Jr	South Charleston, W.V.
F	33	Bob Jamieson	6 ft 5 in (1.96 m)	205 lb (93 kg)	Jr	Greensboro, N.C.
F	13	Brent Kitching	6 ft 6 in (1.98 m)	215 lb (98 kg)	So	Sharon Hill, Pa.
F	45	Ted Mann, Jr.	6 ft 5 in (1.96 m)	197 lb (89 kg)	So	Durham, N.C.
F	44	Jeff Mullins	6 ft 4 in (1.93 m)	185 lb (84 kg)	Jr	Queens, New York City
G	11	Fred Schmidt	6 ft 3 in (1.91 m)	190 lb (86 kg)	Sr	Philadelphia, Pa.
C	31	Hack Tison	6 ft 10 in (2.08 m)	205 lb (93 kg)	So	Geneva, Ill.
G	43	Bill Ulrich	5 ft 10 in (1.78 m)	170 lb (77 kg)		Audubon, N.J.
F	14	Scott Williamson	6 ft 5 in (1.96 m)	210 lb (95 kg)		Sanford, N.C.

Head coach

Vic Bubas

Assistant coach(es)

- Bucky Waters
- Fred Shabel

Legend

- (C) Team captain
- (S) Suspended
- (I) Ineligible
- (W) Walk-on
- Injured
- Current redshirt

Compiled from multiple sources

== Schedule and results ==
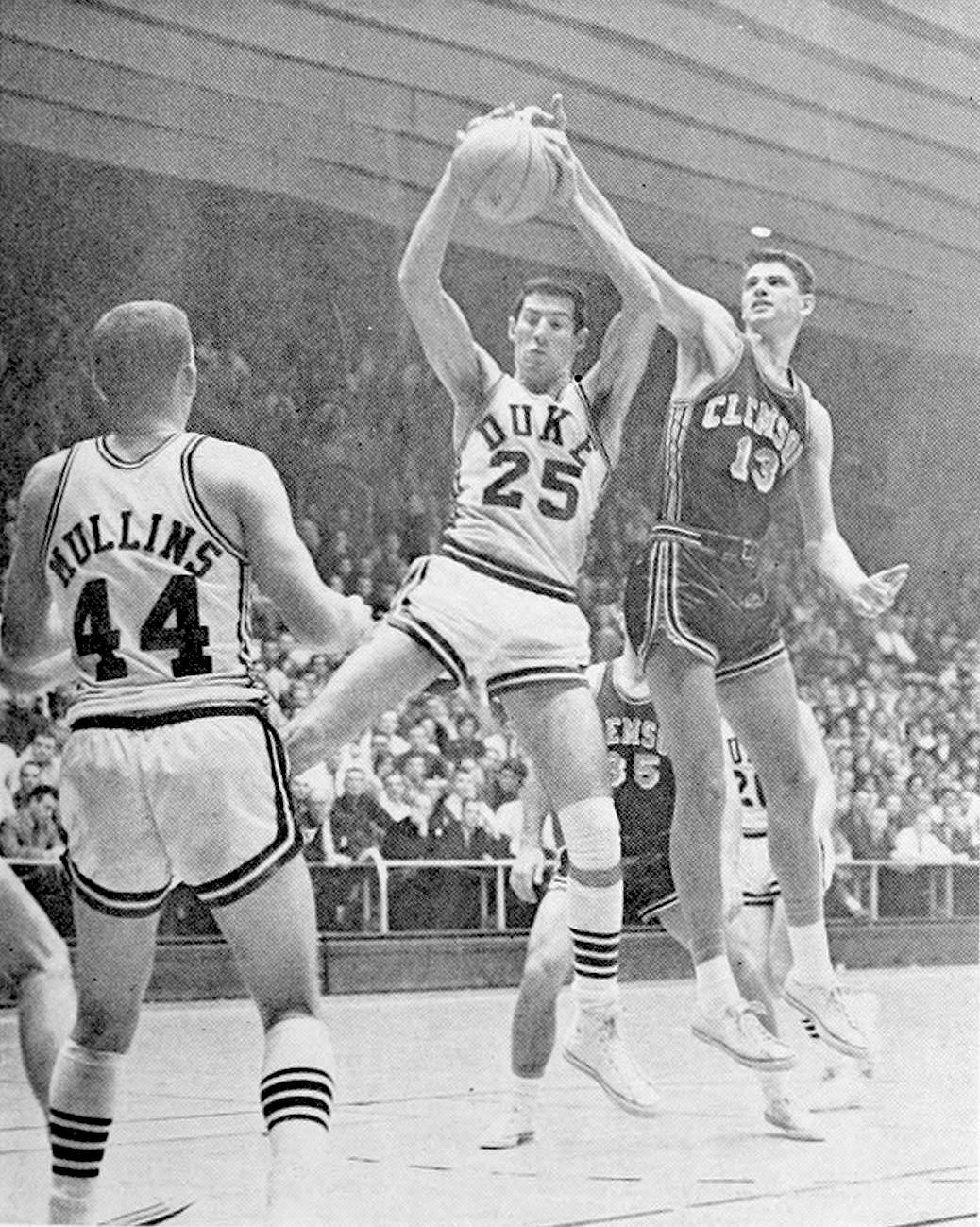
Art Heyman rebounding against Clemson

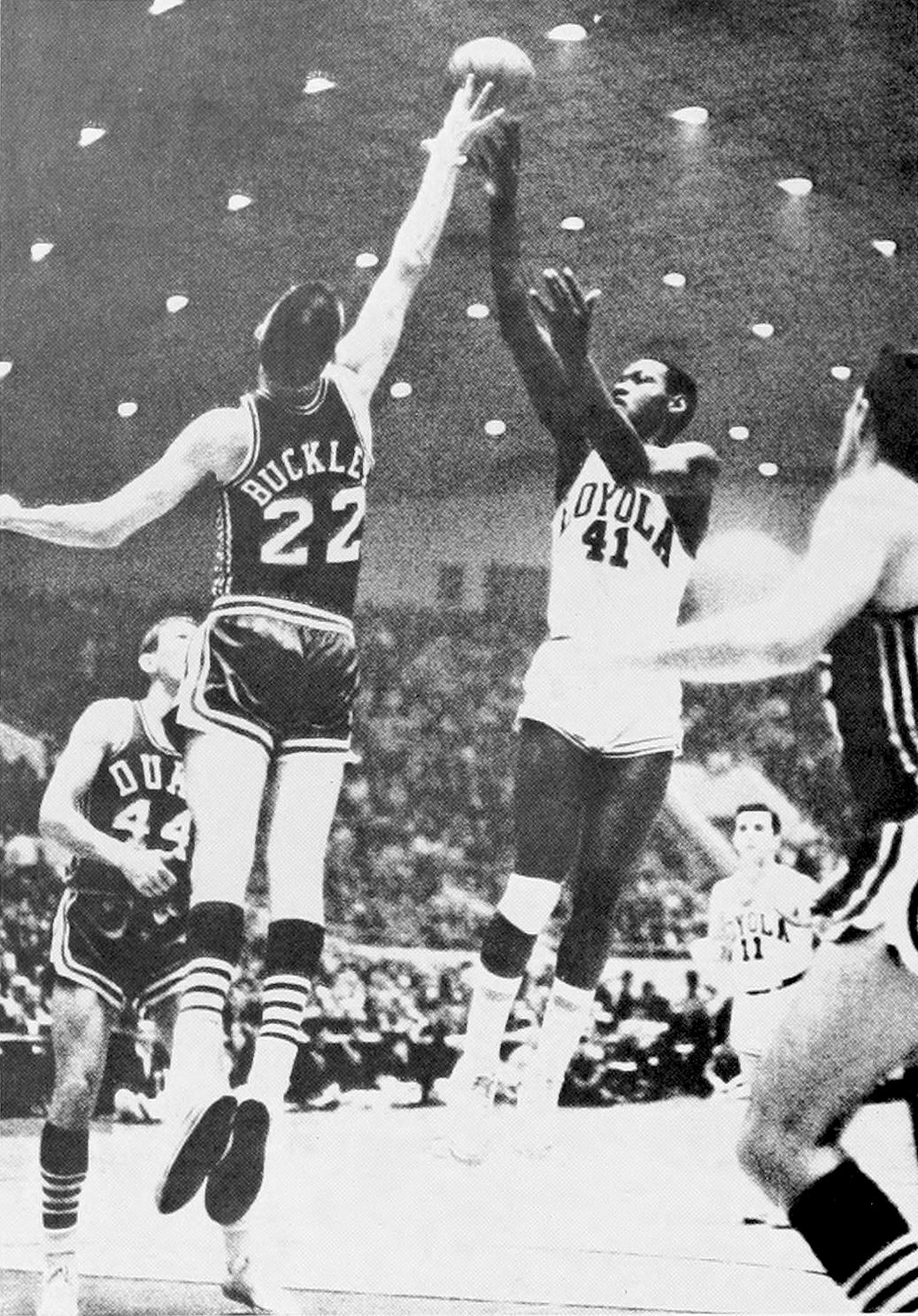
Duke center Jay Buckley blocks Les Hunter of Loyola during the NCAA national semifinal.

Date time, TV	Rank^{#}	Opponent^{#}	Result	Record	Site city, state
Regular season
Dec 1, 1962*	No. 2	Davidson	W 76–68	1–0	Cameron Indoor Stadium; Durham, North Carolina
Dec 4, 1962	No. 2	South Carolina	W 95–63	2–0 (1–0)	Cameron Indoor Stadium; Durham, North Carolina
Dec 8, 1962	No. 2	Maryland	W 92–56	3–0 (2–0)	Cameron Indoor Stadium; Durham, North Carolina
Dec 11, 1962*	No. 2	Vanderbilt	W 90–70	4–0	Cameron Indoor Stadium; Durham, North Carolina
Dec 13, 1962	No. 2	at Clemson	W 92–67	5–0 (3–0)	Clemson Field House; Clemson, South Carolina
Dec 15, 1962*	No. 2	at Louisville	W 76–75	6–0	Freedom Hall; Louisville, Kentucky
Dec 18, 1962*	No. 2	at Davidson	L 69–72	6–1	Charlotte Coliseum; Charlotte, North Carolina
Dec 21, 1962*	No. 2	at Miami (FL)	L 69–71	6–2	Miami Beach Convention Center; Miami, Florida
Dec 28, 1962*	No. 8	Princeton	W 85–74	7–2	Cameron Indoor Stadium; Durham, North Carolina
Dec 29, 1962*	No. 8	vs. Wake Forest	W 113–87	8–2	Greensboro Coliseum; Greensboro, North Carolina
Jan 2, 1963	No. 7	Virginia	W 82–65	9–2 (4–0)	Cameron Indoor Stadium; Durham, North Carolina
Jan 5, 1963	No. 7	NC State	W 78–52	10–2 (5–0)	Cameron Indoor Stadium; Durham, North Carolina
Jan 9, 1963*	No. 6	at Navy	W 85–70	11–2	Halsey Field House; Annapolis, Maryland
Jan 12, 1963	No. 6	Clemson	W 78–67	12–2 (6–0)	Cameron Indoor Stadium; Durham, North Carolina
Jan 26, 1963*	No. 4	No. 6 West Virginia	W 111–71	13–2	Cameron Indoor Stadium; Durham, North Carolina
Jan 29, 1963	No. 3	at South Carolina	W 88–70	14–2 (7–0)	Carolina Fieldhouse; Columbia, South Carolina
Feb 2, 1963	No. 3	at North Carolina	W 77–69	15–2 (8–0)	Woollen Gymnasium; Chapel Hill, North Carolina
Feb 6, 1963	No. 3	at Wake Forest	W 97–66	16–2 (9–0)	Winston-Salem Memorial Coliseum; Winston-Salem, North Carolina
Feb 9, 1963	No. 3	at NC State	W 56–55	17–2 (10–0)	Reynolds Coliseum; Raleigh, North Carolina
Feb 13, 1963	No. 3	at Virginia	W 79–74	18–2 (11–0)	Memorial Gymnasium; Charlottesville, Virginia
Feb 16, 1963	No. 3	Wake Forest	W 73–60	19–2 (12–0)	Cameron Indoor Stadium; Durham, North Carolina
Feb 19, 1963	No. 2	at Maryland	W 76–70	20–2 (13–0)	Cole Fieldhouse; College Park, Maryland
Feb 23, 1963	No. 2	North Carolina	W 106–93	21–2 (14–0)	Cameron Indoor Stadium; Durham, North Carolina
ACC Tournament
Feb 28, 1963*	No. 2	Virginia	W 89–70	22–2	Reynolds Coliseum; Raleigh, North Carolina
Mar 1, 1963*	No. 2	at NC State	W 82–65	23–2	Reynolds Coliseum; Raleigh, North Carolina
Mar 2, 1963*	No. 2	vs. Wake Forest	W 68–57	24–2	Reynolds Coliseum; Raleigh, North Carolina
NCAA Tournament
Mar 15, 1963*	No. 2	vs. No. 9 New York University	W 81–76	25–2	Cole Fieldhouse; College Park, Maryland
Mar 16, 1963*	No. 2	vs. Saint Joseph's	W 73–59	26–2	Cole Fieldhouse; College Park, Maryland
Mar 22, 1963*	No. 2	vs. No. 3 Loyola-Chicago; National Semifinal	L 75–94	26–3	Freedom Hall; Louisville, Kentucky
Mar 23, 1963*	No. 2	vs. Oregon State; National third-place game	W 85–63	27–3	Freedom Hall; Louisville, Kentucky
*Non-conference game. ^{#}Rankings from AP Poll. (#) Tournament seedings in parentheses.

=== NCAA basketball tournament ===
- West
  - Duke 81, New York 76
  - Duke 73, St. Joseph's, Pennsylvania 59
- Final Four
  - Loyola–Chicago 94, Duke 75
- Third-place game
  - Duke 85, Oregon State 63

== Awards and honors ==
- Art Heyman, AP National Player of the Year award
- Art Heyman, ACC Player of the Year award
- Art Heyman, NCAA Men's MOP Award
- Art Heyman, USBWA College Player of the Year

== Team players drafted into the NBA ==
Round	Pick	Player	NBA club
1	1	Art Heyman	New York Knicks
