= 1963 ACC men's basketball tournament =

- Classification: Division I
- Season: 1962–63
- Teams: 8
- Site: Reynolds Coliseum; Raleigh, North Carolina
- Champions: Duke (2nd title)
- Winning coach: Vic Bubas (2nd title)
- MVP: Art Heyman (Duke)

1962–63 ACC men's basketball standings
	Conf.				Overall
Team	W		L	PCT	W		L	PCT
No. 2 Duke †	14	–	0	1.000	27	–	3	.900
Wake Forest	11	–	3	.786	16	–	10	.615
North Carolina	10	–	4	.714	15	–	6	.714
Clemson	5	–	9	.357	12	–	13	.480
NC State	5	–	9	.357	10	–	11	.476
South Carolina	4	–	10	.286	9	–	15	.375
Maryland	4	–	10	.286	8	–	13	.381
Virginia	3	–	11	.214	5	–	20	.200
† 1963 ACC tournament winner Rankings from AP Poll

The 1963 Atlantic Coast Conference men's basketball tournament was held in Raleigh, North Carolina, at Reynolds Coliseum from February 28 through March 2, 1963. Duke defeated Wake Forest, 68–57, to win the championship. Art Heyman of Duke was named tournament MVP.

== Bracket ==
Quarterfinals; February 28
1	#2 Duke	89
8	Virginia	70
4	Clemson	78
5	NC State	79
2	Wake Forest	80
7	Maryland	41
3	North Carolina	93
6	South Carolina	76

Semifinals; March 1
1	#2 Duke	82
5	NC State	65
2	Wake Forest	56
3	North Carolina	55

Championship Game; March 2
1	#2 Duke	68
2	Wake Forest	57
