= Art Heyman =

American basketball player (1941–2012)

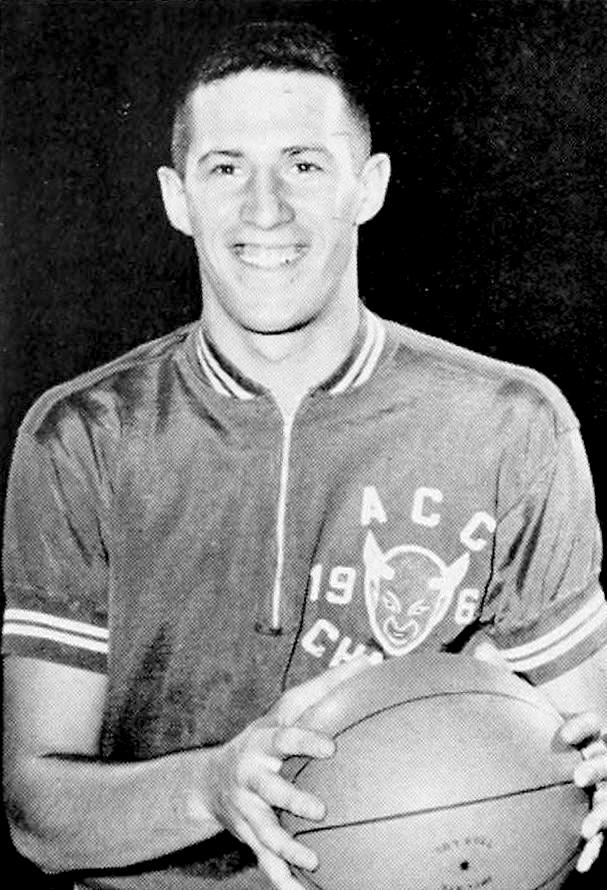
- Heyman with Duke in 1962

Personal information
- Born: June 24, 1941 New York City, New York, U.S.
- Died: August 27, 2012 (aged 71) Clermont, Florida, U.S.
- Listed height: 6 ft 5 in (1.96 m)
- Listed weight: 205 lb (93 kg)

Career information
- High school: Oceanside (Oceanside, New York)
- College: Duke (1960–1963)
- NBA draft: 1963: 1st round, 1st overall pick
- Drafted by: New York Knicks
- Playing career: 1963–1970
- Position: Small forward / shooting guard
- Number: 4, 21, 35, 40, 12, 32

Career history
- 1963–1965: New York Knicks
- 1965: Cincinnati Royals
- 1965–1966: Philadelphia 76ers
- 1966: Wilmington Blue Bombers
- 1966–1967: Hartford Capitols
- 1967: New Jersey Americans
- 1967–1969: Pittsburgh / Minnesota Pipers
- 1969–1970: Miami Floridians

Career highlights
- ABA champion (1968); NBA All-Rookie First Team (1964); All-EPBL First Team (1967); NCAA Final Four MOP (1963); USBWA Player of the Year (1963); AP Player of the Year (1963); UPI Player of the Year (1963); Sporting News Player of the Year (1963); Helms Foundation College Player of the Year (1963); Consensus first-team All-American (1963); Consensus second-team All-American (1962); Third-team All-American – AP, UPI (1961); ACC Player of the Year (1963); ACC Athlete of the Year (1963); 3× First-team All-ACC (1961–1963); No. 25 retired by Duke Blue Devils; First-team Parade All-American (1959)

Career NBA and ABA statistics
- Points: 4,030 (13.0 ppg)
- Rebounds: 1,461 (4.7 rpg)
- Assists: 859 (2.8 apg)
- Stats at NBA.com
- Stats at Basketball Reference
Medals
Men's basketball
Representing the United States
Maccabiah Games
Gold medal – first place	1961 Israel	Men's basketball

Arthur Bruce Heyman (June 24, 1941 – August 27, 2012) was an American professional basketball player. Playing for Duke University in college, in 1963 he was USBWA Player of the Year, AP Player of the Year, UPI Player of the Year, Sporting News Player of the Year, Helms Foundation College Player of the Year, a consensus first-team All-American, ACC Player of the Year, and ACC Athlete of the Year. That year he was the first overall pick in the first round of the 1963 NBA draft. He went on to have a 310-game professional career in the NBA and ABA.

== Early years ==
Heyman, who was Jewish, was born in New York City, and later lived in Rockville Centre, New York, and Oceanside, New York. After attending Oceanside High School in Nassau County, New York, the 6'5" guard/forward was heavily recruited by many schools, and originally signed a letter of intent to play for the North Carolina Tar Heels. At the last moment, however, Heyman changed his mind and agreed to play for the Tar Heels' greatest rivals, the Duke Blue Devils.

== College career ==
Due to NCAA eligibility rules that prohibited freshmen from playing varsity sports, Heyman played his first year at then racially segregated Duke with the freshman team, which compiled a record of 10–5, including three victories over the Tar Heels. During one of the Duke-North Carolina freshman games, North Carolina freshman Dieter Krause attacked Heyman, leading to a melee where the two coaches had to be restrained from attacking each other. Heyman needed five stitches after the attack.

During his sophomore season, Heyman starred for the varsity team, and North Carolina and Duke again were at each other's throats. On February 4, 1961, the Duke and North Carolina freshman teams had played the first game of the double header. There were multiple fights during the game, and North Carolina had finished the game with only three players on the floor (five North Carolina players had fouled out, and three more had been ejected for fighting). During the varsity game that night, Heyman was involved in two incidents, where he first pushed over a fan who he thought was attacking him, and then in the closing minutes of the game, while trying to protect a slim Duke lead, Heyman committed a hard foul against future Hall of Fame coach Larry Brown who was attempting to drive to the hoop. Brown threw the ball and then a punch at Heyman, touching off a general melee, which saw future basketball executive Donnie Walsh, then a substitute player for North Carolina, also attack Heyman. The melee lasted about ten minutes, and despite Heyman being ejected for fighting, his 36 points had given Duke the victory, 81–77.

Brown, Walsh and Heyman were all suspended for the remainder of the ACC season. Heyman was allowed to play in non-conference games, and the ACC Tournament. However, Duke failed to make the postseason, despite Heyman being voted the tournament's outstanding player, losing the ACC Tournament final to the Wake Forest Demon Deacons and their All American Len Chappell, 96–81. At the time, only the league champion was admitted to the NCAA Tournament, and league rules prohibited ACC teams from playing in the NIT Tournament. Heyman finished the season averaging 25 points and nearly 11 rebounds per game, and despite his suspension, Heyman was voted to the All-ACC basketball first team. He also won numerous national plaudits, being named to the UPI and AP Third-Team All American squad.

In 1962, Heyman's junior year, he again had a great year (scoring 25.3 points per game, and averaging over 11 rebounds per game) but Duke failed to make the post season, being upset by the Clemson Tigers in the ACC Tournament semi-final. Heyman was once again voted to the All-ACC Basketball first team, and the AP and UPI Second Team All-American squad.

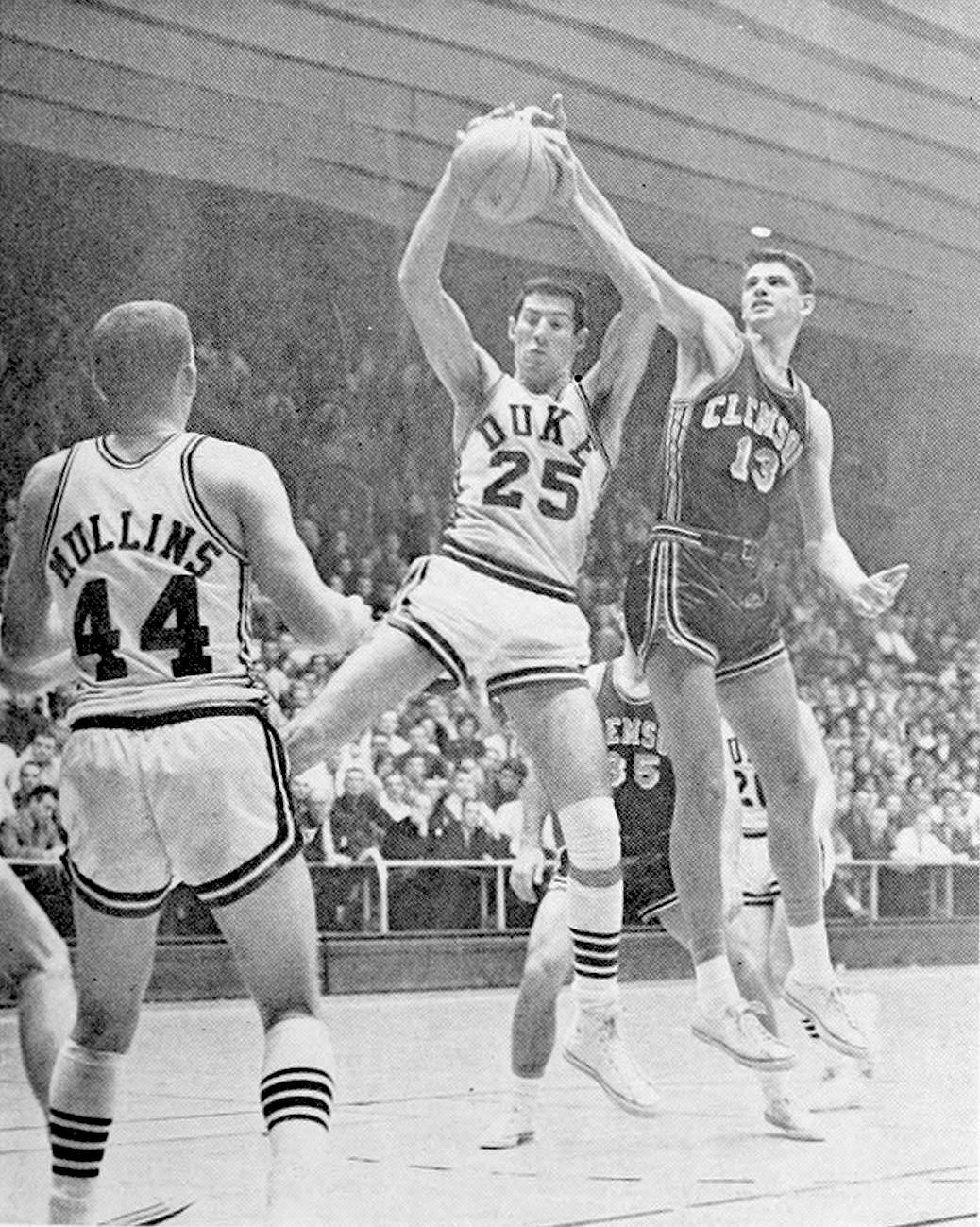
Heyman getting a rebound in a 1963 game against Clemson

However, during Heyman's 1963 senior year, Heyman unleashed his best season yet. Duke won the regular season conference title, but to make the NCAA tournament, they would have to win the ACC tournament. Their first game was against 8th seed Virginia, a game in which the Blue Devils won handily, 89–79. In the tournament semi finals, the Blue Devils defeated the North Carolina State Wolfpack, 82–65. In the final, they had a chance to get revenge for the 1961 tournament final loss, as they faced off against Wake Forest. Heyman and Duke avenged that 1961 loss, defeating the Demon Deacons 68–57, earning the Blue Devils the right to play in the 1963 NCAA Tournament.

The Blue Devils were given a bye to play in the round of 16, and they defeated New York University, who had Happy Hairston and Barry Kramer, 81–76 in the East regional semi-finals, with Heyman scoring 22 points, and adding 13 rebounds. In the East Regional final, Heyman (16 points, 10 rebounds, 3 assists) and the Blue Devils defeated Saint Joseph's University, 73–59, to advance to the Final Four for the first time in school history.

Despite Heyman's 29 points and 12 rebounds in the semi-finals, the Blue Devils succumbed 94–75 to eventual national champion Loyola of Chicago (who had All-American Jerry Harkness). In the consolation game, Heyman completed his college career when Duke defeated Oregon State (who had Heisman Trophy winner Terry Baker) 85–63. In this game, Heyman scored 22 points, and added seven rebounds. Art Heyman was also named MVP of the 1963 NCAA tournament, even though Duke finished third.

Heyman again won the plaudits of the sportswriters, winning the AP National Player of the Year award, the ACC Player of the Year award, and the Oscar Robertson Trophy.

Heyman averaged 25.1 points per game and scoring 1,984 points while at Duke University, which were both school records at that time. Heyman is one of three athletes in ACC History to have been elected unanimously to the All-ACC Men's Basketball team three times, along with David Thompson and Tyler Hansbrough.

== Professional career ==
Heyman's success in college led to him being selected first in the 1963 NBA draft by the New York Knicks. During his first season with the team, he averaged 15.4 points per game and made the NBA All-Rookie Team.

However, his mercurial temper and frequent outbursts saw his playing time with the Knicks decreased during his second year, and his scoring average dropped to 5.7 points per game. Heyman parted ways with New York in 1965, and after brief stints with the Cincinnati Royals and Philadelphia 76ers, he left the NBA for the Hartford Capitols of the Eastern Professional Basketball League (EPBL) in 1966. He was selected to the All-EPBL First Team in 1967.

When the American Basketball Association formed in 1967, Heyman signed with the New Jersey Americans. In December 1967, Heyman was traded by the New Jersey Americans to the Pittsburgh Pipers for guard Barry Leibowitz; the Miami News called it "one of the few straight-Jewish-player trades in sports history." He played in the ABA for three seasons with the Americans, Pittsburgh / Minnesota Pipers, and Miami Floridians, winning a league championship with the Pittsburgh Pipers in 1968 as he averaged over 20 points a game.

== Career statistics ==
Legend
GP	Games played	GS	Games started	MPG	Minutes per game
FG%	Field goal percentage	3P%	3-point field goal percentage	FT%	Free throw percentage
RPG	Rebounds per game	APG	Assists per game	SPG	Steals per game
BPG	Blocks per game	PPG	Points per game	**Bold**	Career high
†	Won an NBA championship	*	Led the league

†	Denotes seasons in which Heyman's team won an ABA championship

=== Regular season ===
Year	Team	GP	GS	MPG	FG%	3P%	FT%	RPG	APG	SPG	BPG	PPG
1963–64	New York (NBA)	**75**	–	29.8	.431	–	.685	4.0	3.4	–	–	15.4
1964–65	New York (NBA)	55	–	12.1	.427	–	.667	1.8	1.4	–	–	5.7
1965–66	Cincinnati (NBA)	11	–	9.1	.349	–	.588	1.2	0.6	–	–	3.6
1965–66	Philadelphia (NBA)	6	–	3.3	.333	–	**.800**	0.7	0.7	–	–	1.7
1967–68	New Jersey (ABA)	19	–	23.1	.385	.176	.644	3.7	1.9	–	–	13.8
1967–68†	Pittsburgh (ABA)	54	–	**39.2**	.447	.274	.751	**7.9**	**4.4**	–	–	**20.1**
1968–69	Minnesota (ABA)	71	–	33.3	.421	**.314**	.697	7.0	3.1	–	–	14.4
1969–70	Pittsburgh (ABA)	1	–	4.0	.000	–	–	0.0	0.0	–	–	0.0
1969–70	Miami (ABA)	18	–	17.0	**.448**	.000	.708	3.2	1.4	–	–	7.8
Career		310	–	26.6	.427	.281	.703	4.7	2.8	–	–	13.0

=== Playoffs ===
Year	Team	GP	GS	MPG	FG%	3P%	FT%	RPG	APG	SPG	BPG	PPG
1968†	Pittsburgh (ABA)	**15**	–	37.6	**.485**	.378	.676	7.1	**3.9**	–	–	**19.7**
1969	Minnesota (ABA)	7	–	**37.7**	.446	**.389**	**.780**	**7.3**	2.9	–	–	17.3
Career		22	–	37.6	.472	.382	.700	7.2	3.5	–	–	19.0

== International career ==
Heyman, Larry Brown and Charley Rosen, led the United States basketball team to a gold medal at the 1961 Maccabiah Games.

== Post-basketball career ==
Heyman retired from professional basketball in 1970 with 4,030 combined NBA/ABA points. He was inducted into the Duke Sports Hall of Fame, the Helms Sports Hall of Fame, the Jewish Sports Hall of Fame, and the Nassau High School Hall of Fame. His Duke jersey number #25 was not retired until 1990, after years of resentment from Heyman. In 1996, he opened Tracy J's Watering Hole in Manhattan, New York.

Heyman died at age 71 on August 27, 2012, in Clermont, Florida.

== See also ==
- List of select Jewish basketball players
- List of All-Atlantic Coast Conference men's basketball teams
