= 1962–63 Atlantic Coast Conference men's basketball season =

== Final standings ==
Team	ACC Regular Season	ACC %	All Games	All Games %	Nonconference Games	Nonconference Games %	Ranked AP All	Ranked AP All %	Ranked AP Nonconference	Ranked AP Nonconference %
Duke	14–0	1.000	27–3	.900						
Wake Forest	11–3	.786	16–10	.615						
North Carolina	10–4	.714	15–6	.714						
Clemson	5–9	.357	12–13	.480						
NC State	5–9	.357	10–11	.476						
South Carolina	4–10	.286	9–15	.375						
Maryland	4–10	.286	8–13	.381						
Virginia	3–11	.214	5–20	.200						
Total			102–91	.528						

== ACC tournament ==
See 1963 ACC men's basketball tournament

== NCAA tournament ==
=== Regional semi-finals ===
Duke 81, New York U 76

=== Regional finals ===
Duke 73, Saint Joseph's 59

=== National semi-finals ===
Loyola (IL) 94, Duke 75

=== National third place ===
Duke 85, Oregon St 63

=== ACC's NCAA record ===
3–1

== NIT ==
League rules prevented ACC teams from playing in the NIT, 1954–1966
