= UMass Minutewomen ice hockey =

- University: University of Massachusetts Amherst
- Conference: Eastern Collegiate Women's Hockey League
- Governing Body: ACHA Women's Division 1
- Head coach: Bill Wright; 8th season, 119–49–12
- Assistant coaches: Kelly Dolan, Brittani Lanzilli
- Captain(s): Juliana Dolan
- Arena: Mullins Center Community Rink; Amherst, Massachusetts
- Colors: Maroon and white

ACHA tournament appearances
- 2003, 2005, 2006, 2007, 2008, 2009, 2010, 2011, 2012, 2013, 2014, 2015, 2016, 2017, 2018, 2020

Conference tournament champions
- ECWHL: 2013, 2015, 2016, 2017

Conference regular season champions
- ECWHL: 2009, 2013, 2015, 2017, 2019, 2020

Current uniform
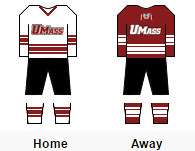

The UMass Minutemen women's ice hockey team represents the University of Massachusetts Amherst (UMass) in Women's Division 1 of the American Collegiate Hockey Association (ACHA) and in the Eastern Collegiate Women's Hockey League (ECWHL). The Minutemen are one of the ACHA's premier programs, having qualified for 16 of the 20 ACHA National Tournaments held for women's teams (within 18 years of total ACHA membership), a number second to Michigan State for the all-time lead. Additionally, UMass has won four ECWHL playoff titles (a conference championship total that trails only rival Rhode Island nationally) and has been the home of two Zoë M. Harris Award winners (Maura Grainger in 2008–09 and Brittani Lanzilli in 2015–16), one of five ACHA D1 programs to produce multiple recipients of the honor.

Bill Wright has been the team's head coach since 2012 and has led the Minutewomen to their only ACHA championship game appearance (2014).

== History ==
=== Early seasons (2002–07) ===
UMass began play in the ACHA for the 2002–03 season and almost immediately joined soon-to-be archrival Rhode Island as one of the northeastern United States' two dominant ACHA programs, a status that has continued to the present day with only rare interruption.

Under head coach Bill Finn, and featuring early stars like three-time All-American Aleta Mills, Jacqui Phillips, Samatha Louras and goalie Becky Trudel, the Minutemen finished second in the East Region and received an autobid to the third-ever ACHA National Tournament, in Muskegon, Michigan. UMass performed well at nationals, finishing second in their four-team group after wins over Northern Michigan and St. Cloud State. While that outcome would have meant a trip to the semifinals under subsequent formats, in 2003 it meant that the Minutemen were dumped in the third-place game, where they dropped a decision to West Los Angeles College. Despite the disappointing finish, the program had announced its arrival in a way few have, before or since.

The 2003–04 season saw UMass contribute to two notable pieces of history. That season, the program helped start the Eastern Collegiate Women's Hockey League, with Rhode Island, Penn State, Buffalo and Boston University as the other founding members. From January 16–19, 2004, UMass hosted an event dubbed the "UMass White Out Tournament," the first mid-season showcase event held within the ACHA's women's divisions. Invited teams included new conference opponents Rhode Island and Buffalo, along with West LA College, Robert Morris (IL) (the eventual champion) and Colorado. Louras, meanwhile, finished that year with 37 points, good enough to place ninth on the ACHA's top scorers list and become the first documented Minuteman to rank in the top ten.

The Minutemen made it to the ECWHL championship game to close each of the league's first three seasons, but as was the pattern of the time, lost each to URI (the Rams were the circuit's dominant team early on and would not lose an ECWHL playoff game until 2011). The maroon and white did, however, fire off back-to-back ACHA National Tournament bids in 2005 and 2006. The first was the stronger of the two runs, thanks to a 3–1 pool win over Michigan, powered by Emily Slotnick's game-winning goal and two assists, that sent UMass through to the quarterfinals. The Great Lakes State got the best of the Bay State when given another chance though, as Michigan State upended the Minutemen 2–1 on the way to a second-place finish.

Beginning in the mid-2000s, UMass continued to grow its program by aggressively pursuing scheduling against NCAA varsity opposition, including Castleton State, MIT, Sacred Heart and Holy Cross.

The team hosted the ACHA National Tournament at the Mullins Center to close 2006–07, a tournament notable as the first in association history to include two women's divisions, as ACHA Women's Division 2 began play that season. St. Scholastica won the inaugural D2 title, while Robert Morris (IL) took the crown in the Minutemen's D1. UMass, meanwhile, was somewhat fortunate to receive an automatic hosting bid to the tourney that year – that final season's ranking of 15th was its lowest ever and one that wouldn't have otherwise earned a spot a nationals. The Minutemen did outperform their seed, thanks to a 4–0 upset of No. 8 Michigan in the pool round that advanced UMass to the quarterfinals, however a 1–0 loss to Rhode Island there ended the run.

=== Rise to prominence (2007–12) ===
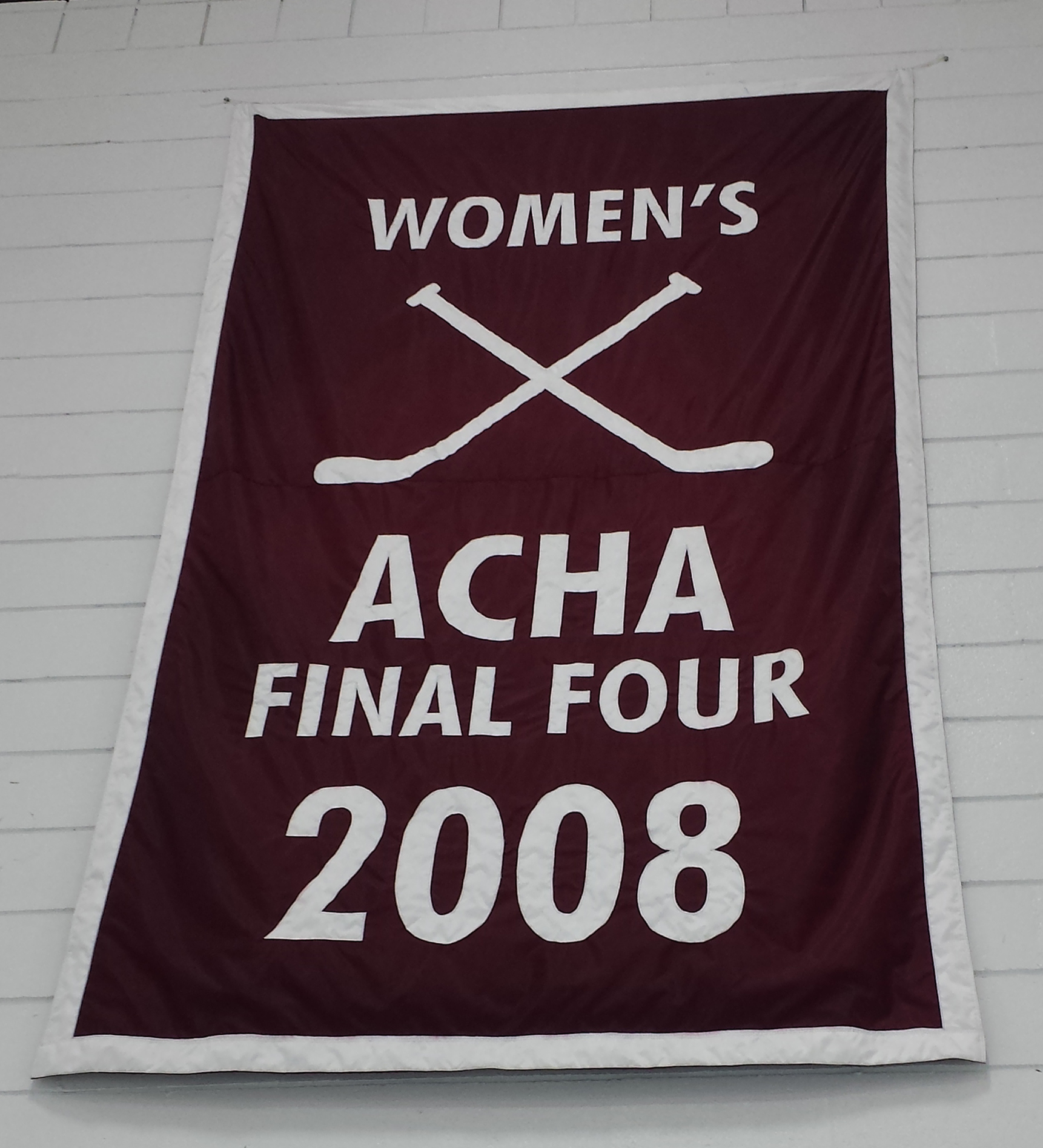
Mullins Center banner marking UMass' first trip to the ACHA semifinals in 2008

The 2007–08 and 2008–09 seasons were notable as UMass' first serious foray into the national championship discussion, thanks to new head coach Chris Cobb and a sudden talent infusion led by Maura Grainger and URI transfer Cara Murphy. Grainger, who began her collegiate career with Providence College's NCAA Division I program, fired home 44 goals and 74 points during her first season in Amherst (the latter number a program record), and would go on to win UMass' first Zoë M. Harris Award the following year. Murphy, for her part, totaled 88 points in just 50 games over her two seasons. The Minutemen entered the 2008 ACHA National Tournament as the number four seed and battered Michigan State and Nichols by identical 5–2 scorelines to win Pool D, then topped Wisconsin (Pool C's second-place team) 4–1 in the quarterfinals. Things went down from there however, as Lindenwood (which was then in the heart of a streak of five consecutive title game appearances with four wins) knocked UMass off of the championship track in the semifinals. Rhode Island, with the stakes much lower than in the previous tournament, then defeated the Minutemen by a 3–1 count in the third-place game.

A follow-up effort in 2009's championships in Rochester, New York saw UMass fall one round earlier – in the quarterfinals – yet arguably closer to a title. Thanks to some unfortunate pool placement, largely due to eventual runner-up Robert Morris (IL) underachieving during the regular season and ranking fifth, the fourth-seeded Minutemen drew the Eagles in their pool, where they dropped a 5–2 result. While UMass still advanced to the quarterfinals, it did so as second in its pool as was therefore paired up with a pool winner in the form of Lindenwood, a team on the way to the second of three consecutive national championships. The Bay Staters did push the Lions like few teams of that era could though, in taking an early lead before LU tied things up late, then won in double overtime on an Alexandra Johansson goal. Still, 2008–09 did see one unprecedented success: UMass finally broke through and finished first in the ECWHL standings to take the regular season league title, the first time since the ECWHL's founding that Rhode Island did not win both the regular season and playoff crowns. URI managed to save face by quadrupling a Caitlin Scannell goal in a 4–1 win for that year's playoff title.

Grainger's departure for 2009–10, along with the loss of other stars like Murphy, Jill Clark and standout goalie Christen Eulian, signaled a bit of a transition period for the program. Even UMass' customary spot in the top two of ECWHL was no longer safe thanks to Northeastern, which won the ACHA Division 2 national championship in 2009–10, then immediately moved up to Division 1. The Huskies emphatically announced their arrival by winning both ECWHL titles in 2010–11. Even with less conference success than had become customary, the Minutemen did continue to qualify for nationals – albeit narrowly, as the 8th, 7th and 8th seed in the eight-team fields of 2010, 2011 and 2012, with their 2012 inclusion ahead of an ECWHL regular season champion Penn State squad seen as controversial in some corners. However, the 2010–11 and 2011–12 seasons saw UMass stockpile much of the core that would lead to the team's next substantial ACHA title run, including Sarah Oteri, Chelsea Corell, Amanda Abromson, Sam Gouin, Meghan Crosby, Caleigh Labossiere and Chelsea and Raschelle Bräm. The high ceiling of that group began to show during the 2012 ACHA National Tournament, when UMass silenced doubters with a shocking run to the semifinals thanks to pool round ties against the first and third seeds (Robert Morris (IL) and Rhode Island), then a win over sixth-ranked Michigan to sneak ahead of URI into second place in the group. That set up an unlikely semifinal pairing between the two lowest-seeded teams in the tournament: the Minutemen and No. 7 Northeastern. However, the Huskies took the all-Massachusetts tilt 4–0 and went on to win the title behind tournament MVP goalie Chelsea Dietz, who conceded just three goals in five tournament games.

UMass scored a historic 4–3 victory over three-time defending national champion Lindenwood on January 22, 2011, thanks to Rachel Gantt's late power play winner and 47 saves by Kelsey Magrane. The Lions lost just 26 times in eight ACHA seasons before moving to NCAA Division I following that 2010–11 season, and although they were missing six players due to the 2011 World University Games tournament, the squad remaining stateside went 4–0 against other opponents during the tournament, including a pair of wins against contender Robert Morris (IL).

=== Bill Wright era (2012–present) ===
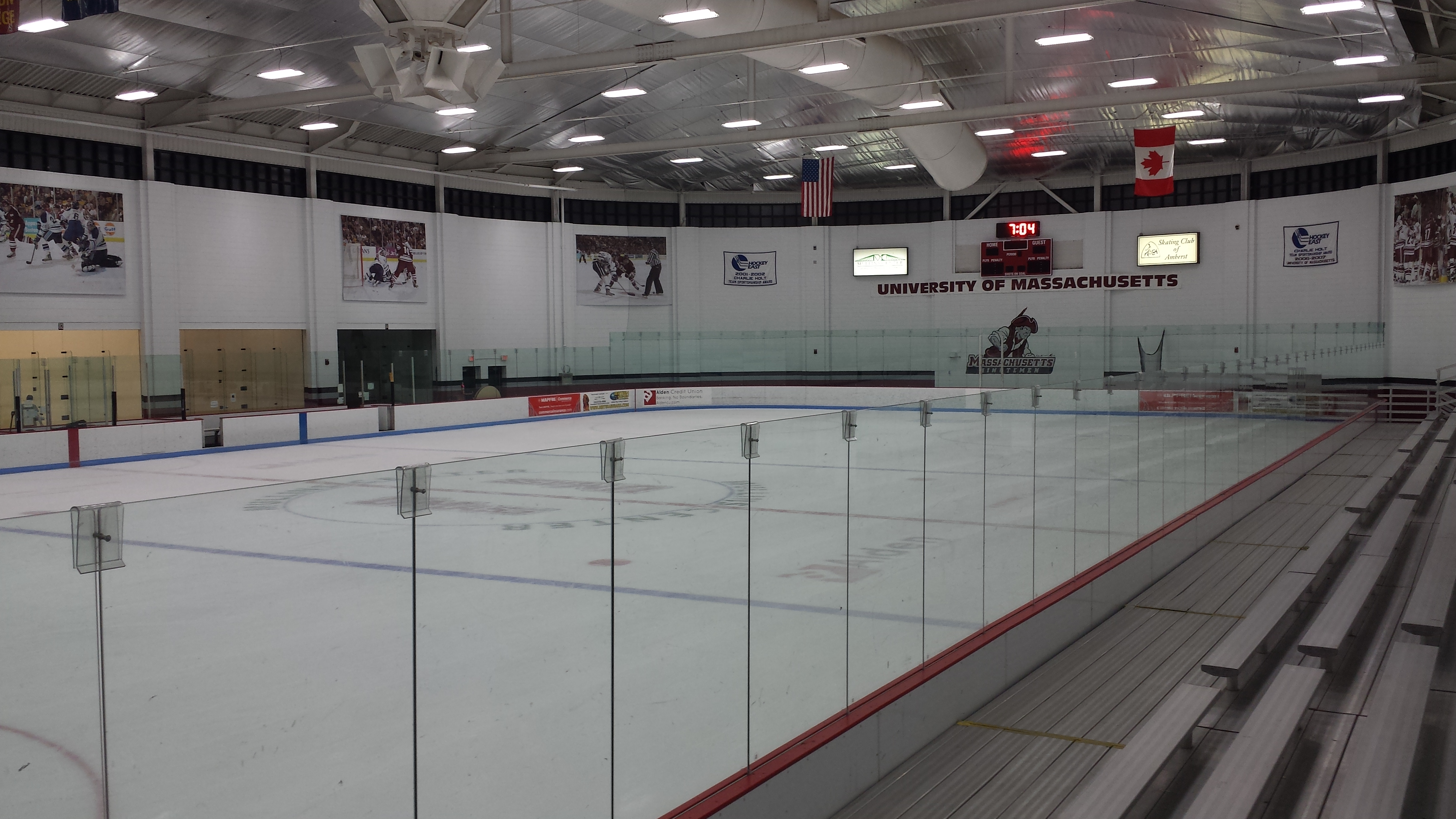
The Mullins Center Community Rink, UMass' home ice throughout its history

==== 2012–13 ====
The Minutewomen got a new head coach in 2012–13 when Bill Wright took over for Chris Cobb, who had taken a coaching job in NCAA Division III with Williams College. Wright inherited a strong team that already included the aforementioned stars, along with key freshmen Ally Perdios and Jess Greenwood, and Penn State transfer Paige Harrington. By the end of the regular season, were ranked second only to Liberty. That bit of history was made possible by another: UMass' first-ever ECWHL tournament title, thanks to a 2–1 title game win over defending ACHA national champion Northeastern. An impressive journey at the ACHA National Tournament in Ashburn, Virginia followed, with an opening 3–2 win over 2011 national champ Michigan State, as second-period goals from Oteri, Labossiere and Chelsea Bräm turned around an early 2–0 deficit. Although Northeastern took an ECWHL final rematch in the day one nightcap (the first day of the tournament involved two pool games played by each team at the time), two more Oteri goals delivered a vital 2–1 victory over Robert Morris (IL) that, along with tiebreaker help, sent UMass through to the semifinals for the third time in program history. Once there, however, eventual champ Minnesota jumped on the Minutemen for three goals in the first ten minutes of the contest en route to a 5–1 result.

==== 2013–14 ====
After coming off of a pair of ACHA semifinal appearances and beginning fifth in the rankings, the Minutemen put together a 20–6–1 regular season to climb into the second seed for ACHAs, just three voting points ahead of Rhode Island in third. The URI side likely felt that they deserved better thanks to their 2–0 shutout of UMass to recapture the ECWHL playoff title, although the Minutemen would be able to point to their sweep of Rhody by identical 4–1 scores just two weeks prior to that in reply. Away from the ACHA (and the Western Hempishere, for that matter), Abromson, Corell, Harrington, Labossiere and Oteri were selected for the 2013 U.S. National University Team that competed at the 2013 World University Games, eventually winning bronze medals in Trentino, Italy in December 2013.

The pool round at the ACHA National Tournament in Newark, Delaware was a tight-checking, nail-biting two days. An upstart Liberty team (the runners-up from 2013, but only seeded seventh in 2014) gave the Minutemen all the trouble they wanted before a Chelsea Bräm goal with 5:02 remaining squeaked out a 2–1 victory. That evening, UMass survived another close call, as Labossiere buried Adrian in overtime by a 2–1 count after the Bulldogs tied things late. After those two wins secured a spot in the semifinals – and results early on the second day of the tournament clinched first place in the pool – Robert Morris (IL) overcame two Harrington goals with five in the second period, as the Eagles picked up what amounted to a consolation win by a 6–4 count. The contest was notable as a meeting of future Buffalo Beauts teammates Harrington and Hayley Williams (who grabbed an assist), and as a World University Games reunion of sorts – in addition to the five Minutemen and Williams, RMU's Jessica Merritt and Ramey Weaver were also on Team USA, with the latter both its captain and leading scorer.

In the semifinals, UMass and Rhode Island played in a notable game of their rivalry. Corell and URI's Kayla DiLorenzo, two of the ACHA's best goalies, traded saves with 29 and 23 stops, respectively, but early goals from Labossiere and Raschelle Bräm secured them a 2–1 victory. The Minutemen fell one win short of their intended destination though, as Miami University formally launched a dynasty that would eventually grab three national titles in four years with a 3–1 championship game win. Siobhan Elvin scored a shorthanded goal for UMass to make the score 2–1 early in the second period, but Kaley Mooney answered quickly for the RedHawks and penalty trouble down the stretch doomed a comeback attempt. Nevertheless, the second-place finish remains the program's high water mark.

==== 2014–15 and 2015–16 ====
Although the next two years didn't produce much success at nationals (UMass failed to win a game at the tournament in both 2015 and 2016), particularly compared to the three straight final four runs of 2012 through 2014, they were marked by gains in other areas. For example, after a lengthy stretch of Rhode Island dominance from 2003 to 2010 and heavily contested outcomes from 2010 to 2014, 2014–15 more or less kicked off UMass' tenure as the rulers of the ECWHL. A 15–3–0 league record was good enough to edge URI for the regular season title, and the Minutemen followed that up by shelling the Rams 7–2 in the playoff championship game behind two goals each from Mallory O'Brien and Brittani Lanzilli. That win set off a run of three straight league title game wins for the Minutemen through the 2016–17 season, each over URI, as UMass gained the upper hand in the storied rivalry.

On October 11, 2014, UMass had the opportunity to play in the 8,387-seat main arena of the Mullins Center for the first time during Wright's tenure, a rarity as the team typically practices and plays in the adjacent Community Rink. Although the game was delayed for 45 minutes due to ice conditions (the UMass men's team tore up the ice just prior to the scheduled game time while being bag skated following their 8–1 defeat to Jack Eichel and Boston University the night before), UMass topped Penn State 1–0 on a second-period Michaela Tosone goal and a Kasey Zegel shutout.

During the 2015–16 season Lanzilli, then a sophomore, became UMass' second Zoë M. Harris Award winner after topping ACHA Division 1 in scoring with 49 goals and 68 points in just 29 games. Early in the 2016–17 season, the former Medford High School star passed Grainger to become the program's all-time leading scorer. She also became the third Minuteman to earn First or Second Team ACHA All-American status multiple times, following Mills and Angela Rufo.

==== 2016–17 ====
While the 2016–17 campaign was similar to the previous two in some ways (a dual ECWHL championship, an ACHA tournament bid), it was also different in others. Beyond his typically stout freshman class, Wright picked up three key transfers, including goaltender Amber Greene (via Penn State's NCAA Division I team), swing player Sonja Klumpp (who led the Delaware Valley Collegiate Hockey Conference in scoring as a freshman at Maryland) and Olivia Knight (another NCAA player, from Division III's Nichols College). Thus bolstered, the Minutemen wasted no time in picking up the key non-conference win that had proven somewhat elusive in recent seasons: a wild 5–4 outcome over then-second-ranked Liberty, an affair that saw UMass go from up 3–0 after the first period to down 4–3 early in the third, before goals from Tatum Schulz and Joanna Olson pulled the tilt back. Other key non-conference results included a subsequent tie against the Flames, another with No. 1 Miami, still another with No. 5 Grand Valley State and a rout of No. 9 Michigan. Meanwhile, the Minutewomen flexed an unprecedented amount of muscle within the ECWHL, as a late-season tie with Rhode Island was the only blemish on the squad's league record over 14 regular season games and a pair of playoff matches, including the third straight championship game win over URI.

UMass' quest at the ACHA National Tournament – never in doubt, as the team was not ranked lower than fifth after the Liberty win and finished in fourth – got off to a catastrophic start when the Minutemen had to forfeit the first game of a best-of-three quarterfinal series against fifth-seeded Lindenwood–Belleville (under a new tournament format introduced that season) thanks to Winter Storm Stella and related travel difficulties to Columbus, Ohio. The squad, however, arrived in time for game two and proceeded to overcome the unfortunate series deficit with consecutive wins over the Lynx to return to the semifinals. Lanzilli (who would go on to an all-tournament selection and once again led the nation in scoring) and linemate Olson led the way through the 7–3 and 4–2 wins with a combined six goals and four assists. Top-seeded Liberty abruptly ended things in the final four by handing the Minutemen a 1–0 defeat, thanks to a second-period Chelsey Greenwood goal.

==== 2017–18 ====
In 2017–18, UMass showed early promise when an Olson overtime goal boosted the Minutemen over a national-title-contending Michigan State team, as part of a solid start to the year. However, the team was decimated with several key injuries by November, including Lanzilli, Kelly Dolan, and Courtney Sullivan, while another notable player, Katy Turner, studied in Hawai'i during the first half of the year. The remaining skaters, particularly Olson, UMass' leading scorer for most of Lanzilli's absence, managed to keep things afloat for the most part, although one casualty of the situation was the ECWHL championship. With the league reduced to three teams, thanks to the departures of Vermont and Northeastern after the 2016–17 season, it did not conduct a playoff, instead declaring its regular season winner the overall champion. While still affected by injuries, the Minutemen dropped their series to Rhode Island with a 1–2–1 record in games played during December and January, and the Rams would go on to win the crown after both they and UMass went 4–0–0 against Penn State, the third remaining ECWHL member.

Nationally, a 1–2–0 weekend at a Robert Morris-hosted showcase in early November (including a come-from-ahead loss to the hosts on a late Emily Urban goal) dropped Massachusetts from 5th to 8th in the rankings, and the Minutemen would spend the remainder of the year on the bubble for the eight-team ACHA National Tournament. A strong finish to the regular season, particularly a key sweep of eventual Western Women's Collegiate Hockey League champion Colorado in February, ultimately locked down an ACHA-best 15th nationals bid for the program. However, second-seeded Adrian made short work of No. 7 UMass at the tournament, sweeping their best-of-three quarterfinal series.

==== 2018–19 and 2019–20 ====
The core from the team's previous run of success graduated in 2018 (Lanzilli, Dolan, Greene, Schulz, Meredith Gallagher and Sam Baturin) and 2019 (Olson, Knight, Courtney Sullivan, Hannah Sullivan and Meghan Lawler). Wright was forced to reload the roster in a short span of time. Juliana Dolan, who eventually became team captain, was one player who helped bridge the transition of the team. The next generation of Minutemen stars included Kat Nikolopoulos, who scored 30 points in each of her first two seasons in Amherst, Holly Russell who was an explosive swing player, Minnesotan Sandra Bienkowski, and goaltender Casey Marshall, a product of the esteemed New Jersey Rockets program.

The team got off to a 5–1–0 start in 2018–19, but then lost to Michigan State by a 4–3 count on November 2, 2018 and (somewhat inexplicably, as MSU is a perennial top ten team) tumbled from 4th to 8th in the rankings. UMass dropped to 9th the next week after a 1–2–0 weekend at the Robert Morris University Showcase and would not make it back into the top eight for the rest of the season, missing the ACHA National Tournament for the first time since 2004 (a streak of 14 appearances in a row). The Minutemen, as usual, performed strongly within the ECWHL, winning the regular season (which has served as the only league championship since 2018), but were ultimately doomed by a 6–7–0 mark against a tough out-of-conference schedule including powerhouses like the Spartans, Liberty, Lindenwood–Belleville, and McKendree. Juliana Dolan's overtime goal against URI on February 8, 2019, gave Wright his 100th win as head coach.

After that hiccup, 2019–20 saw a return to UMass' more typical form including just six losses all season, four of which came against two-time defending national champion Liberty. Season sweeps of ECWHL opponents Rhode Island and Penn State helped the team stay in the 5th or 6th spot in the rankings all year long, but the Minutemen truly announced themselves as a contender on January 18, 2020, with a 2–0 victory against No. 3 Lindenwood–Belleville fueled by a 32-save Marshall shutout and goals from Nikolopoulos and Dolan.

UMass qualified for their 16th ACHA National Tournament as the fifth seed and were scheduled to take on fourth-seeded Adrian in the quarterfinals, however the tournament was cancelled due to the COVID-19 pandemic. Nevertheless, Wright was honored as the ACHA Division 1 coach of the year on the heels of the bounceback season.

== Recent season by season results ==
| Won Championship | Lost Championship | Regular Season Conference Champions |

| Year | Coach | W | L | T | Conference | Conf. W | Conf. L | Conf. T | Finish | Conference Tournament | ACHA Tournament |
| 2019–20 | Bill Wright | 15 | 6 | 1 | ECWHL | 9 | 2 | 0 | 1st | Tournament not held ^{†} | Tournament not held ^{‡} Quarterfinals vs. Adrian (scheduled) |
| 2018–19 | Bill Wright | 15 | 9 | 0 | ECWHL | 9 | 0 | 0 | 1st | Tournament not held ^{†} | Did not qualify |
| 2017–18 | Bill Wright | 16 | 11 | 1 | ECWHL | 5 | 2 | 1 | 2nd | Tournament not held ^{†} | Lost Quarterfinals vs. Adrian (1–4, 1–2 OT) |
| 2016–17 | Bill Wright | 21 | 6 | 4 | ECWHL | 13 | 0 | 1 | 1st | Won Semifinals vs. Northeastern (9–1); Won Championship vs. Rhode Island (3–0) | Won Quarterfinals vs. Lindenwood-Belleville (0–1 Forfeit, 7–3, 4–2); Lost Semifinals vs. Liberty (0–1) |
| 2015–16 | Bill Wright | 17 | 9 | 3 | ECWHL | 11 | 3 | 2 | 2nd | Won Semifinals vs. Vermont (2–1); Won Championship vs. Rhode Island (4–3) | Lost Pool Round vs. Adrian (1–3); Lost Pool Round vs. Miami (1–4); Lost Pool Round vs. Rhode Island (2–5) |
| 2014–15 | Bill Wright | 24 | 8 | 1 | ECWHL | 15 | 3 | 0 | 1st | Won Semifinals vs. Vermont (5–2); Won Championship vs. Rhode Island (7–2) | Lost Pool Round vs. Grand Valley State (0–2); Tied Pool Round vs. Penn State (3–3 OT); Lost Pool Round vs. Liberty (1–2) |

^{†} The ECWHL's regular season winner was named its sole champion, by mutual agreement of the membership and the commissioner
^{‡} The 2020 ACHA National Tournament was canceled due to the COVID-19 pandemic

== ACHA National Tournament results ==
The Minutemen have appeared in the ACHA National Tournament 16 times, with top-four finishes in 2003, 2008, 2012, 2013, 2014 and 2017. Their combined record in all games is 17–34–3.

| Year | Location | Seed | Round | Opponent | Results |
| 2003 | Muskegon, Michigan | #2E | Pool Round; Pool Round; Pool Round; Third-place game | #2W Wisconsin #1C Northern Michigan #1WC St. Cloud State #1W West LA College | L 1–6; W 4–0; W 3–2; L 0–3 |
| 2005 | Amherst, New York | #7 | Pool Round; Pool Round; Quarterfinals | #2 Lindenwood #11 Michigan #3 Michigan State | L 1–2; W 3–1; L 1–2 |
| 2006 | Wentzville, Missouri | #6 | Pool Round; Pool Round; Consolation Game | #3 Michigan State #10 Colorado #11 North Dakota State | L 1–3; L 3–5; W 5–0 |
| 2007 | Amherst, Massachusetts | #12 | Pool Round; Pool Round; Quarterfinals | #1 Robert Morris (IL) #8 Michigan #4 Rhode Island | L 0–6; W 4–0; L 0–1 |
| 2008 | Bensenville, Illinois | #4 | Pool Round; Pool Round; Quarterfinals; Semifinals; Third-Place Game | #5 Michigan State #9 Nichols #8 Wisconsin #1 Lindenwood #2 Rhode Island | W 5–2; W 5–2; W 4–1; L 2–6; L 1–3 |
| 2009 | Rochester, New York | #4 | Pool Round; Pool Round; Quarterfinals | #5 Robert Morris (IL) #9 Wisconsin #3 Lindenwood | L 2–5; W 6–0; L 1–2 2OT |
| 2010 | Blaine, Minnesota | #8 | Pool Round; Pool Round; Pool Round | #1 Lindenwood #4 Grand Valley State #6 Michigan State | L 0–5; L 0–5; L 2–6 |
| 2011 | Kalamazoo, Michigan | #7 | Pool Round; Pool Round; Pool Round | #2 Robert Morris (IL) #4 Northeastern #5 Michigan State | L 1–9; L 1–4; L 0–3 |
| 2012 | Wooster, Ohio | #8 | Pool Round; Pool Round; Pool Round; Semifinals; Third-Place Game | #1 Robert Morris (IL) #3 Rhode Island #6 Michigan #7 Northeastern #1 Robert Morris (IL) | T 4–4 OT; T 1–1 OT; W 3–2; L 0–4; L 1–5 |
| 2013 | Ashburn, Virginia | #2 | Pool Round; Pool Round; Pool Round; Semifinals; Third-Place Game | #7 Michigan State #5 Northeastern #4 Robert Morris (IL) #3 Minnesota #4 Robert Morris (IL) | W 3–2; L 2–3; W 2–1; L 1–5; L 2–7 |
| 2014 | Newark, Delaware | #2 | Pool Round; Pool Round; Pool Round; Semifinals; Championship | #7 Liberty #5 Adrian #4 Robert Morris (IL) #3 Rhode Island #1 Miami | W 2–1; W 2–1 OT; L 4–6; W 2–1; L 1–3 |
| 2015 | York, Pennsylvania | #4 | Pool Round; Pool Round; Pool Round | #5 Grand Valley State #7 Penn State #2 Liberty | L 0–2; T 3–3 OT; L 1–2 |
| 2016 | Kalamazoo, Michigan | #5 | Pool Round; Pool Round; Pool Round | #4 Adrian #2 Miami #7 Rhode Island | L 1–3; L 1–4; L 2–5 |
| 2017 | Columbus, Ohio | #4 | Quarterfinals (G1); Quarterfinals (G2); Quarterfinals (G3); Semifinals | #5 Lindenwood-Belleville #5 Lindenwood-Belleville #5 Lindenwood-Belleville #1 Liberty | L 0–1 Forfeit; W 7–3; W 4–2; L 0–1 |
| 2018 | Columbus, Ohio | #7 | Quarterfinals (G1); Quarterfinals (G2) | #2 Adrian #2 Adrian | L 1–4; L 1–2 OT |
| 2020 | Frisco, Texas | #5 | Quarterfinals | #4 Adrian | Tournament not held ^{‡} |

^{‡} The 2020 ACHA National Tournament was canceled due to the COVID-19 pandemic

== Program records ==
As of April 2, 2019. ACHA games only, beginning with the 2003–04 season.

=== Career scoring leaders ===
| Name | Years | Games | Goals | Assists | Points |
| Brittani Lanzilli | 2014–18 | 110 | 127 | 68 | 195 |
| Michaela Tosone | 2013–17 | 123 | 42 | 99 | 141 |
| Maura Grainger | 2007–09 | 49 | 79 | 43 | 122 |
| Sarah Oteri | 2010–14 | 114 | 59 | 59 | 118 |
| Joanna Olson | 2015–19 | 112 | 53 | 54 | 107 |
| Ally Perdios | 2012–17 | 118 | 36 | 67 | 103 |
| Amanda Abromson | 2011–15 | 107 | 47 | 55 | 102 |
| Cara Murphy | 2007–09 | 50 | 39 | 49 | 88 |
| Juliana Dolan | 2016–20 | 103 | 38 | 47 | 85 |
| Jill Clark | 2005–09 | 104 | 27 | 57 | 84 |
| Emily Slotnick | 2003–06^ | 61 | 35 | 45 | 80 |
| Chelsea Bräm | 2010–14 | 116 | 33 | 39 | 72 |
| Angela Rufo | 2006–10 | 100 | 26 | 46 | 72 |
| Raschelle Bräm | 2010–14 | 115 | 29 | 39 | 68 |
| Meghan Crosby | 2011–15 | 114 | 28 | 38 | 66 |
| Meghan Lawler | 2015–19 | 112 | 31 | 34 | 65 |
| Catherine O'Brien | 2007–11 | 102 | 27 | 38 | 65 |
| Kat Nikolopoulos | 2018–present | 46 | 28 | 34 | 62 |
| Paige Harrington | 2012–15 | 79 | 22 | 37 | 59 |
| Caitlin Scannell | 2007–10 | 75 | 33 | 26 | 59 |
| Samantha Louras | 2003–05^ | 48 | 29 | 29 | 58 |
| Caleigh Labossiere | 2011–15 | 102 | 20 | 36 | 56 |
| Anne-Marie Plain | 2003–06^ | 70 | 30 | 25 | 55 |
| Aleta Mills | 2003–05^ | 35 | 22 | 30 | 52 |
| Heather Paonessa | 2009–13 | 109 | 17 | 33 | 50 |
| Kelly Dolan | 2015–18 | 82 | 12 | 30 | 42 |

=== Single season scoring leaders ===
| Name | Year | Games | Goals | Assists | Points |
| Maura Grainger | 2007–08 | 27 | 44 | 30 | 74 |
| Brittani Lanzilli | 2015–16 | 29 | 49 | 19 | 68 |
| Cara Murphy | 2007–08 | 28 | 27 | 30 | 57 |
| Brittani Lanzilli | 2016–17 | 29 | 34 | 19 | 53 |
| Michaela Tosone | 2015–16 | 29 | 12 | 38 | 50 |
| Maura Grainger | 2008–09 | 22 | 35 | 13 | 48 |
| Brittani Lanzilli | 2014–15 | 30 | 25 | 21 | 46 |
| Emily Slotnick | 2005–06 | 30 | 24 | 21 | 45 |
| Michaela Tosone | 2014–15 | 30 | 11 | 32 | 43 |
| Joanna Olson | 2016–17 | 31 | 15 | 27 | 42 |
| Michaela Tosone | 2016–17 | 31 | 15 | 24 | 39 |
| Samantha Louras | 2003–04 | 25 | 19 | 18 | 37 |
| Amanda Abromson | 2014–15 | 29 | 15 | 22 | 37 |
| Sarah Oteri | 2013–14 | 29 | 14 | 23 | 37 |
| Ally Perdios | 2015–16 | 27 | 14 | 22 | 36 |
| Sarah Oteri | 2012–13 | 27 | 20 | 15 | 35 |
| Jill Clark | 2005–06 | 30 | 18 | 17 | 35 |
| Aleta Mills | 2004–05 | 21 | 17 | 18 | 35 |
| Kat Nikolopoulos | 2019–20 | 22 | 14 | 18 | 32 |
| Caitlin Scannell | 2007–08 | 28 | 19 | 12 | 31 |
| Cara Murphy | 2008–09 | 22 | 12 | 19 | 31 |
| Joelle Vautour | 2005–06 | 24 | 6 | 25 | 31 |
| Kat Nikolopoulos | 2018–19 | 24 | 14 | 16 | 30 |
| Brittani Lanzilli | 2017–18 | 19 | 19 | 9 | 28 |
| Juliana Dolan | 2019–20 | 22 | 15 | 13 | 28 |
| Emily Slotnick | 2004–05 | 19 | 10 | 18 | 28 |

=== Notable goaltenders ===
| Name | Years | Minutes | Saves | Save Pct. | GAA | Shutouts |
| Chelsea Corell | 2010–14 | 4602.15 | 2089 | 0.933 | 1.97 | 15 |
| Amber Greene | 2016–18 | 3217.30 | 1356 | 0.944 | 1.51 | 13 |
| Kasey Zegel | 2011–15 | 3114.87 | 1120 | 0.914 | 2.02 | 9 |
| Casey Marshall | 2018–present | 2416.87 | 1032 | 0.930 | 1.94 | 11 |
| Kelsey Magrane | 2009–13 | 1932.56 | 938 | 0.913 | 2.76 | 3 |
| Samantha Baturin | 2014–18 | 1562.50 | 460 | 0.870 | 2.65 | 1 |
| Christen Eulian | 2005–09^{+} | 1483.13 | 662 | 0.909 | 2.67 | 1 |
| Bethany Welch | 2013–17 | 963.23 | 309 | 0.893 | 2.30 | 4 |
| Becky Trudel | 2004–05^ | 696.28 | 300 | 0.857 | 4.31 | 0 |
| Krystal Oldread | 2004–06^{+} | 573.00 | 257 | 0.889 | 3.35 | 1 |
| Katie Avery | 2009–10 | 473.08 | 194 | 0.866 | 3.80 | 1 |
| Christine Kemp | 2004–06^{+} | 434.00 | 198 | 0.880 | 3.73 | 1 |
| Dolly Beechiner | 2004–06^{+} | 330.00 | 90 | 0.947 | 0.91 | 4 |
| Gabrielle Busa | 2008–11^{+} | 238.24 | 36 | 0.923 | 0.76 | 0 |
| Samantha Dexter | 2003–04^ | 204.00 | 88 | 0.978 | 0.59 | 2 |

^ Career includes games prior to the 2003–04 season.

+ Career includes games in the 2006–07 and/or 2007–08 seasons, during which the ACHA did not accurately track goaltending statistics.

== ACHA ranking history ==
=== National rankings ===
The ACHA began compiling a national ranking in 2003–04, issued four times per season, with the top twelve (from 2003–04 through 2008–09) or eight (from 2009–10 on) in the fourth ranking, released in February, receiving a bid to the ACHA National Tournament. A preseason ranking was initiated beginning with 2014–15, then discontinued in 2018–19 when the ACHA switched to an entirely computer-based ranking. Beginning with the 2016–17 season, the ACHA tabulated rankings each week during the season and issued them on Tuesdays following weekends including games.

| Year | Ranking | | | | | | | | | | | | | | | | | |
| Year | Pre | 1 | 2 | 3 | 4 | 5 | 6 | 7 | 8 | 9 | 10 | 11 | 12 | 13 | 14 | 15 | 16 | 17 |
|---|---|---|---|---|---|---|---|---|---|---|---|---|---|---|---|---|---|---|
| 2003–04 | | 9 | 9 | 10 | 9 | | | | | | | | | | | | | |
| 2004–05 | | 10 | 8 | 8 | 7 | | | | | | | | | | | | | |
| 2005–06 | | 5 | 6 | 6 | 6 | | | | | | | | | | | | | |
| 2006–07 | | RV | RV | RV | 15 | | | | | | | | | | | | | |
| 2007–08 | | 6 | 7 | 7 | 5 | | | | | | | | | | | | | |
| 2008–09 | | 6 | 3 | 4 | 4 | | | | | | | | | | | | | |
| 2009–10 | | 8 | 7 | 7 | 8 | | | | | | | | | | | | | |
| 2010–11 | | 9 | 10 | 8 | 7 | | | | | | | | | | | | | |
| 2011–12 | | 9 | 6 | 6 | 8 | | | | | | | | | | | | | |
| 2012–13 | | 14 | 7 | 5 | 2 | | | | | | | | | | | | | |
| 2013–14 | | 5 | 5 | 2 | 2 | | | | | | | | | | | | | |
| 2014–15 | 2 | 3 | 5 | 3 | 4 | | | | | | | | | | | | | |
| 2015–16 | 6 | 4 | 5 | 5 | 5 | | | | | | | | | | | | | |
| 2016–17 | 6 | 6 | 2 | 2 | 3 | 3 | 5 | 3 | 4 | 4 | 4 | 4 | 4 | 4 | 4 | 4 | 4 | 4 |
| 2017–18 | 5 | 5 | 6 | 6 | 6 | 5 | 8 | 8 | 8 | 8 | 9 | 8 | 8 | 9 | 7 | 7 | 7 | 7 |
| 2018–19 | | 4 | 4 | 8 | 9 | 9 | 9 | 9 | 9 | 9 | 9 | 10 | 10 | 10 | | | | |
| 2019–20 | | 6 | 6 | 5 | 5 | 6 | 6 | 6 | 5 | 5 | 5 | 5 | 5 | | | | | |

=== Regional rankings ===
From 2000–01 through 2002–03, regional rankings were the sole method for determining ACHA National Tournament bids. The inaugural 2000–01 season featured teams divided into East and West Regions, with the top four from each in February's final ranking invited to nationals. For 2001–02 and 2002–03 (the latter being UMass' first ACHA season), the setup was expanded to include East, Central and West Regions. Under that system, the top two from each region were invited to nationals, along with two wild card teams. In 2003–04, the tournament field was expanded to 12 teams, and a national ranking was introduced. The latter development diminished the importance of the regional rankings, as the national rankings were used to determine nationals bids. Regional champions were still awarded an autobid, however, even if ranked outside of the top 12 nationally. In 2004–05, growth in the number of ACHA women's teams resulted in an increase to four regions – Northeast, Southeast, Central and West – although things reverted to East, Central and West in 2007–08. The 2009–10 season was notable both for the fact that the tournament field was reduced back to eight teams and as the final year of the regional system, which had become largely antiquated as regional champions generally had little issue placing highly in the national rankings.

| Year | Ranking | | | | |
| Year | 1 | 2 | 3 | 4 | 5 |
|---|---|---|---|---|---|
| 2000–01 | Not an ACHA member | | | | |
| 2001–02 | Not an ACHA member | | | | |
| 2002–03 | 3E | 3E | 2E | 2E | |
| 2003–04 | 2E | 2E | 2E | 2E | |
| 2004–05 | 3NE | 3NE | 3NE | 2NE | |
| 2005–06 | 2NE | 3NE | 3NE | 3NE | |
| 2006–07 | – | 4NE | 5NE | 5NE | |
| 2007–08 | 3E | 3E | 3E | 3E | |
| 2008–09 | 2E | 1E | 2E | 2E | |
| 2009–10 | 4E | 3E | 3E | | |

== ACHA national honors ==
=== Annual awards ===
All-Americans and All-Tournament selections including all seasons except 2008–09. Academic All-Americans including all seasons except 2007–08 and 2008–09.

First Team All-American

- Aleta Mills – 2002–03
- Becky Trudel – 2004–05
- Maura Grainger – 2007–08
- Paige Harrington – 2014–15
- Caleigh Labossiere – 2014–15
- Brittani Lanzilli – 2015–16

Second Team All-American

- Jacqui Phillips – 2002–03
- Aleta Mills – 2003–04, 2004–05
- Samantha Louras – 2004–05
- Emily Slotnick – 2005–06
- Jackie Schnare – 2005–06
- Cara Murphy – 2007–08
- Angela Rufo – 2007–08, 2009–10
- Christen Eulian – 2007–08
- Rachel Gantt – 2011–12
- Chelsea Corell – 2011–12
- Sarah Oteri – 2013–14
- Amber Greene – 2016–17
- Brittani Lanzilli – 2016–17, 2017–18

All-American Honorable Mention

- Becky Trudel – 2002–03, 2003–04
- Samantha Louras – 2003–04
- Jill Clark – 2005–06

Zoë M. Harris Player of the Year

- Maura Grainger – 2008–09
- Brittani Lanzilli – 2015–16

Coach of the Year

- Bill Wright – 2019–20

Off-Ice Most Valuable Player

- Hayley Kuhn – 2009–10
- Sam Gouin – 2011–12

Community Playmaker Award

- Sam Gouin – 2013–14

First Team All-Tournament

- Aleta Mills – 2002–03
- Becky Trudel – 2004–05
- Christen Eulian – 2006–07
- Maura Grainger – 2007–08
- Sarah Oteri – 2012–13
- Caleigh Labossiere – 2013–14

Second Team All-Tournament

- Cara Murphy – 2007–08
- Christen Eulian – 2007–08
- Laura Lichterman – 2011–12
- Amanda Abromson – 2011–12
- Brittani Lanzilli – 2016–17

All-Tournament Honorable Mention

- Becky Trudel – 2002–03
- Aleta Mills – 2004–05
- Jamie Bawden – 2005–06
- Emily Slotnick – 2005–06
- Kayla Guedes – 2006–07
- Angela Rufo – 2006–07
- Courtney Smith – 2007–08

Academic All-American

- Kelly Craven – 2002–03
- Nicole Barletta – 2003–04
- Kristin Hockman – 2003–04
- Aleta Mills – 2003–04, 2004–05
- April Zenisky – 2003–04
- Emily Slotnick – 2004–05, 2005–06
- Samantha Louras – 2004–05
- Becky Trudel – 2004–05
- Laura Walendzwicz – 2004–05
- Jamie Bawden – 2005–06
- Anne-Marie Plain – 2005–06
- Angela Rufo – 2009–10
- Catherine O'Brien – 2010–11
- Jess Greenwood – 2015–16
- Bailey Ingalls – 2015–16, 2016–17
- Ally Perdios – 2015–16
- Shannon Reilly – 2015–16
- Michaela Tosone – 2015–16, 2016–17
- Bethany Welch – 2015–16, 2016–17
- Pauline Ayer – 2016–17
- Sam Baturin – 2016–17, 2017–18
- Kelly Dolan – 2016–17
- Brittani Lanzilli – 2016–17, 2017–18
- Amy Morin – 2016–17
- Joanna Olson – 2016–17, 2017–18, 2018–19
- Courtney Sullivan – 2017–18, 2018–19
- Katy Turner – 2017–18, 2018–19
- Juliana Dolan – 2018–19, 2019–20
- Sonja Klumpp – 2018–19
- Shannon Nagle – 2018–19
- Hannah Sullivan – 2018–19
- Saorise Connolly – 2019–20
- Kelly DeMarco – 2019–20
- Katherine Lombardo – 2019–20
- Casey Marshall – 2019–20

=== Monthly awards ===
During the 2013–14, 2014–15 and 2015–16 seasons, the ACHA presented a series of monthly awards for both men's and women's divisions.

Harrow Defenseman of the Month

- Caleigh Labossiere – September 2014
- Paige Harrington – November 2014

Warrior Goaltender of the Month

- Kasey Zegel – December 2014

== World University Games selections ==
Since 2011, the ACHA has supplied players for the U.S. National University Select Women's Team, which competes at the World University Games women's hockey tournament, held biennially and as part of the multi-sport event for college and university student-athletes. UMass has been among the ACHA's top-contributing programs to the WUG effort, including a total of eight different players selected for Team USA 11 times.

Minutemen have generally been far more than passengers when selected. Paige Harrington served as an alternate captain both times she was a member of Team USA, including for the 2013 event in Trentino, Italy, which saw Harrington and four other Minutemen win bronze medals. It was a historic finish as a first medal for any American team in the modern era (USA Hockey resumed its participation in the WUG on the men's side in 2001 after a lengthy hiatus) and just the second overall, following the U.S. men in 1972 (who "earned" bronze medals by finishing third in a three-team tournament). Amanda Abromson led the 2013 UMass delegation in scoring with a pair of goals and an assist, including a go-ahead marker in the semifinals against Russia, while goalie Chelsea Corell appeared in three contests, including a preliminary-round shutout of Spain.

Three Minutemen from the 2013 team – Harrington, Abromson and Caleigh Labossiere – returned to play at the 2015 World University Games and were joined by newcomer Vicki Bortolussi. Although Team USA dropped out of medal contention quickly, the UMass players combined for 12 points over five tournament games. One of the points, an assist by Labossiere, set up Emily Ford's overtime goal in a come-from-behind victory against Kazakhstan that helped clinch fifth place.

The 2017 edition of the squad, which included Brittani Lanzilli and Amber Greene, repeated 2013's trip to the podium by again winning the bronze medal. Greene, Team USA's starting goalie, excelled throughout the tournament, finishing third among all netminders in both goals against average (3.00) and save percentage (0.929). She made 32 saves on 34 Japan shots in a key 3–2 U.S. pool round win that (eventually) allowed the team to advance to the semifinals, and then delivered a 28-save shutout of China in the bronze medal match.

| Year | Location | Player | Result |
|---|---|---|---|
| 2013 | Trentino, Italy | (United States) Amanda Abromson | Bronze Medal |
| 2013 | Trentino, Italy | (United States) Chelsea Corell | Bronze Medal |
| 2013 | Trentino, Italy | (United States) Paige Harrington | Bronze Medal |
| 2013 | Trentino, Italy | (United States) Caleigh Labossiere | Bronze Medal |
| 2013 | Trentino, Italy | (United States) Sarah Oteri | Bronze Medal |
| 2015 | Granada, Spain | (United States) Amanda Abromson | Fifth Place |
| 2015 | Granada, Spain | (United States) Vicki Bortolussi | Fifth Place |
| 2015 | Granada, Spain | (United States) Paige Harrington | Fifth Place |
| 2015 | Granada, Spain | (United States) Caleigh Labossiere | Fifth Place |
| 2017 | Almaty, Kazakhstan | (United States) Amber Greene | Bronze Medal |
| 2017 | Almaty, Kazakhstan | (United States) Brittani Lanzilli | Bronze Medal |

=== 2010 ACHA women's select team ===
As a precursor to World University Games participation, the ACHA assembled a women's select team that toured Geneva, Switzerland, Chamonix, France and Méribel, France during April 2010. The team included Brittany Resendes as UMass' sole player representative, while Minutemen head coach Chris Cobb was an assistant to Rhode Island's Beth McCann. Its final record overseas was 2–2–0, including two close losses to the France women's national ice hockey team and two decisive wins over local club teams.

== Professional players ==
UMass has, by most measures, been the ACHA's most successful program in terms of advancing players to women's professional hockey leagues. The group is headlined by Paige Harrington, who signed a one-year, $10,000 contract with the Buffalo Beauts of the National Women's Hockey League for the team and circuit's inaugural 2015–16 season. After re-signing for a second season, Harrington helped the Beauts to the 2017 Isobel Cup through a 3–2 title-game upset of the Boston Pride, avenging a championship game loss to the Pride to end the previous year. That July, Harrington signed with the Pride – the closest NWHL team to her hometown of Mansfield, Massachusetts – for the 2017–18 campaign, her last as a pro.

Chelsea and Raschelle Bräm played for SC Reinach in Switzerland from their 2014 graduations through the 2019–20 season. They have been teammates with several notable Swiss players during their careers including Florence Schelling and Julia Marty, both of whom won bronze medals at the 2014 Winter Olympics. SC Reinach struggled in 2016–17, but the twins were vital in a relegation series win against SC Weinfelden, combining for four goals and seven points to save their squad's top-flight status. Of particular importance among those points were Raschelle's goal and assist and Chelsea's goal in a 4–0 fourth-game win to force a decisive fifth contest. SC Reinach then bounced back in 2017–18 to qualify for the playoffs, in part thanks to Raschelle's career-best ten points, and has been a fixture there since.

On May 6, 2020, the Bräms switched teams and signed with ZSC Lions, citing a desire to move to Zürich.

| Player | Position | UMass Seasons | Professional Organization(s) | Professional Seasons |
|---|---|---|---|---|
| Chelsea Bräm | F | 2010–2014 | SC Reinach (SWHL A); ZSC Lions (SWHL A) | 2014–20; 2020–present |
| Raschelle Bräm | F | 2010–2014 | SC Reinach (SWHL A); ZSC Lions (SWHL A) | 2014–20; 2020–present |
| Paige Harrington | D | 2012–2015 | Buffalo Beauts (NWHL), 2015–17: 2016–17 Isobel Cup champion; Boston Pride (NWHL), 2017–18 | 2015–18 |

== Rivalries ==
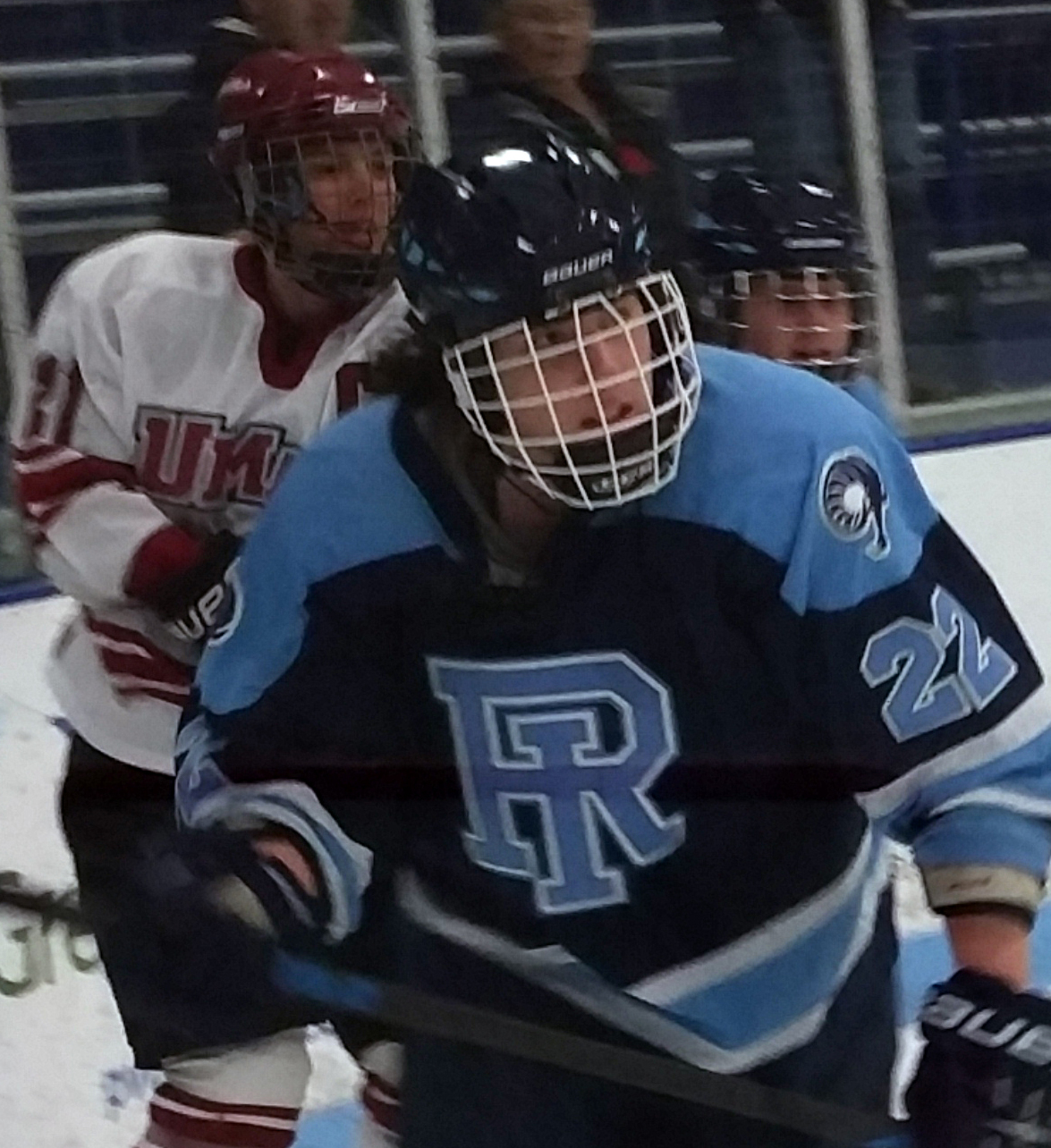
Rhode Island's Kristy Kennedy in action against UMass' Caleigh Labossiere during the 2015 ECWHL championship game

=== Rhode Island ===
Few, if any, rivalries in the ACHA match the history and stakes of UMass' frequent showdowns with Rhode Island. The two teams were founding members of the Eastern Collegiate Women's Hockey League in 2003–04, and are the only two to remain in the league through its entire existence. No fewer than 10 times in the 14 seasons where an ECWHL playoff has been held, the title game has been a UMass-URI contest, with the Rams enjoying a 7–3 advantage in those games (although the Minutemen have won the last three). Among the more memorable ECWHL championship games were two overtime contests, both won by URI, including a 5–4 result in 2005. Three years later, Rhode Island stormed out to a 3–0 lead after the first period, only to see UMass reply with four unanswered to take the lead in the third period. However, the Rams forced overtime with a late equalizer, allowing URI's Justine Ducie to win the trophy in the sixth minute of the third extra period. Most recently, Amber Greene's 26-save shutout allowed second-period goals by Brittani Lanzilli, Lanzilli again and Michaela Tosone to produce a 3–0 win on February 26, 2017. Even when not competing head to head, the league nearly always runs through at least one of the teams, as there have been only three regular season or playoff titles in ECWHL history won by anyone else (Northeastern won the regular season and playoff championships in 2010–11, Penn State took the regular season in 2011–12).

Not surprisingly, the northeast's two dominant programs are also frequent factors in the bigger picture, as both programs rank in the top five nationally in the number of ACHA National Tournament appearances. Since 2002–03, one of the two has been among the ACHA's final four to end 12 of 17 seasons in which a tournament was contested. Somewhat surprisingly, given all of that, UMass has only run into Rhode Island five times at nationals, and only three times with something other than bragging rights attached (two meetings, both URI wins, were the 2008 third-place game and a 2016 pool round meeting after both teams had already been eliminated). In 2007, the Rams edged UMass 1–0 at the Mullins Center to end the bottom-seeded Minutemen's chances in the quarterfinals. A 2012 pool round game ended in a 1–1 tie as Sarah Oteri and Johanna Leskinen traded goals while Chelsea Corell and Kayla DiLorenzo traded saves, although the Minutemen ultimately advanced to the tournament semifinals ahead of Rhode Island. In 2014, the biggest game of the group took place, in the national semifinals. Corell and DiLorenzo (both of whom ended the year among the national top five in goals against average, save percentage and shutouts) engaged in another goaltending duel, but first-period markers from Caleigh Labossiere and Raschelle Bräm proved decisive in a 2–1 UMass victory.

That 2013–14 season was a defining one of the rivalry in several ways, even prior to the semifinal tilt, as each team presented one of the most talented rosters in their respective storied histories. They combined to contribute eight players – more than one-third of the roster – to the 2013 World University Games bronze medal effort, including Lauren Hillberg, Alisha Difilippo and Cassie Catlow on the URI side. Back in the U.S., the Rams and Minutemen jockeyed at the top of the ACHA and ECWHL as usual, with neither ranked lower than fifth all year long. Rhode Island won the conference bragging rights with a 2–0 ECWHL championship game win to follow up the regular season title. However, the Minutemen edged out the Rams to finish second in the rankings thanks to a sweep just before the ECWHL playoffs and, of course, would go on to win the head-to-head matchup in the ACHA semifinals.

Immediately after 2013–14, UMass went on a run of three consecutive ECWHL playoff championship game wins over URI, along with four of the next six regular season titles. The Rams did manage the regular season and overall title in 2017–18, as well as the 2015–16 regular-season crown. The series, beginning with the 2014–15 season, is 20–9–3 in UMass' favor.

One other significant event in the rivalry's history took place in 2007, when Cara Murphy transferred from URI to UMass. Murphy had been a second-team All-American twice with the Rams, while leading the team in scoring during the 2006–07 season. She finished her career in the Bay Staters' colors with another pair of All-American seasons.

=== Penn State ===
While UMass' rivalry with Penn State pales in comparison to the one with URI, it has nevertheless been a consistent presence throughout Minutemen program history as PSU, like UMass and URI, was a founding member of the ECWHL and has been in the league for all but two of its 14 seasons. The teams have met four times at the ECWHL playoffs (a scheduled fifth was nixed by a 2010 snowstorm), with UMass enjoying a 3–1–0 advantage in those games. None were better than the contest that took place on February 28, 2004, at Rhode Island's Brad Boss Arena. The wild affair saw Aleta Mills and Samantha Louras each score four times – yet it wasn't quite enough, as the Lady Icers' Katie King scored four of her own on the way to an 8–8 tie after regulation, where neither team ever led by more than two and with only three stretches of more than 5:00 without a goal being scored. In the second overtime, Mills' fifth tally sent the Minutemen to the first-ever league championship game.

The Minutemen have faced Penn State once at the ACHA National Tournament. In that game, a pool round meeting on March 5, 2015, PSU ran out to a 3–1 lead after two periods but UMass rallied for a 3–3 tie after Amanda Abromson scored with 1:04 left in regulation.

Similarly to the Rhode Island rivalry with respect to Cara Murphy, UMass has also poached some of its all-time greats from Penn State. Future NWHL player Paige Harrington began her career at PSU in 2011–12, where she helped the Lady Icers go 2–0–1 against the Minutemen, including a win in the ECWHL semifinals. The Mansfield, Massachusetts native subsequently returned home and would go 3–1–1 against Penn State over the rest of her career. Goaltender and 2017 World University Games hero Amber Greene also began her collegiate career at Penn State, although as a member of the school's separate NCAA Division I team.

Since the ECWHL's founding, the Minutemen are 37–12–2 against Penn State, through the 2019–20 season.

== Players ==
=== Notable alumni ===
- Sarah Oteri (2010–14) – Head coach of three-time state semifinalist co-op girls hockey team representing Methuen High School and Tewksbury Memorial High School, and 2017–18 Boston Globe coach of the year
- Bailey Ingalls (2013–17) – Student at Harvard Medical School, graduated in the top ten of UMass' class of 2017

== See also ==
- American Collegiate Hockey Association
- Eastern Collegiate Women's Hockey League
- UMass Minutemen ice hockey
- William D. Mullins Memorial Center
- University of Massachusetts Amherst
