= Eastern Collegiate Women's Hockey League =

- Conference: ACHA
- Founded: 2003
- Commissioner: Bill Wright
- Sports fielded: Ice Hockey
- Division: Women's Division 1
- No. of teams: 3
- Region: New England, Mid-Atlantic

Locations

The Eastern Collegiate Women's Hockey League (ECWHL) is an American Collegiate Hockey Association Women's Division 1 club level hockey-only college athletic conference for women's hockey teams. It is one of four ACHA Women's Division 1 conferences, along with the Central Collegiate Women's Hockey Association, the Western Women's Collegiate Hockey League, and Women's Midwest College Hockey. Primarily, the league has been concentrated in New England and Upstate and Western New York, with eleven of its thirteen members over fourteen seasons based in those areas.

The University of Rhode Island has been the ECWHL's most successful program in conference play, winning nine playoff championships and nine regular season championships in 17 years. URI and Massachusetts are the only two founding members that have remained in the ECWHL throughout its entire existence, and both have frequently qualified for the ACHA's National Tournament - 12 and 15 times, respectively, while in the ECWHL. However, former member Northeastern University owns the league's sole ACHA National Championship, as the Huskies defeated the University of Minnesota in the final to win in 2011–12.

== Current membership ==
Institution	Location	Nickname	Founded	Type	Enrollment	Colors	Primary Facility
University of Massachusetts	Amherst, Massachusetts	Minutemen	1863	Public	30,593	Maroon and White	William D. Mullins Memorial Center
Pennsylvania State University	University Park, Pennsylvania	Nittany Lions	1855	Public/State-Related	46,723	Blue and White	Pegula Ice Arena
University of Rhode Island	Kingston, Rhode Island	Rams	1892	Public	17,064	Keaney Blue, Dark Blue and White	Bradford R. Boss Arena

=== Former members ===
- Boston University (2003–2005)
- University at Buffalo (2003–2008, 2009–2014)
- Bates College (2004–2007)
- Norwich University (2005–2007)
- North Country Community College (2005–2007)
- University of Connecticut (2006–2009)
- State University of New York at Canton (2012–2013)
- United States Naval Academy (2014–2015)
- University of Vermont (2011–2017)
- Northeastern University (2010–2017)

Notably, four ECWHL members have left the league in order to transition to NCAA varsity status. These alumni programs include Boston University and Penn State in NCAA Division I and Norwich and Canton in NCAA Division III. Penn State re-entered the ECWHL in 2014 with a separate ACHA Division 1 program. Buffalo, Connecticut, Navy, Vermont and Northeastern all departed while dropping to the ACHA's Division 2, where each remains today. Bates presently competes in the non-ACHA division of the Independent Women's Collegiate Hockey League. NCCC left for a non-ACHA conference, the Northeast Women's College Hockey Association, but has since ceased operations.

== Playoff championship game results ==
Beginning with the 2006 playoffs, the previous season's champion serves as the host.

Year	Champion	Score	Runner-Up	Location
2004	Rhode Island	9–2	Massachusetts	Kingston, Rhode Island
2005	Rhode Island	5–4 (OT)	Massachusetts	Amherst, Massachusetts
2006	Rhode Island	4–2	Massachusetts	Kingston, Rhode Island
2007	Rhode Island	4–1	Norwich	Kingston, Rhode Island
2008	Rhode Island	5–4 (3OT)	Massachusetts	Kingston, Rhode Island
2009	Rhode Island	4–1	Massachusetts	Kingston, Rhode Island
2010	Rhode Island			Kingston, Rhode Island
2011	Northeastern	6–5	Rhode Island	Kingston, Rhode Island
2012	Rhode Island	4–1	Penn State	Boston, Massachusetts
2013	Massachusetts	2–1	Northeastern	Kingston, Rhode Island
2014	Rhode Island	2–0	Massachusetts	Amherst, Massachusetts
2015	Massachusetts	7–2	Rhode Island	Kingston, Rhode Island
2016	Massachusetts	4–3	Rhode Island	Amherst, Massachusetts
2017	Massachusetts	3–0	Rhode Island	Amherst, Massachusetts
2018	Playoff not held ^{†}			
2019	Playoff not held ^{†}			
2020	Playoff not held ^{†}			

^{†} Due to the small number of teams in the conference, the ECWHL's regular season winner was named its sole champion, by mutual agreement of the membership and the commissioner

=== Regular season champions ===
- 2003–04 Rhode Island
- 2004–05 Rhode Island
- 2005–06 Rhode Island
- 2006–07 Rhode Island
- 2007–08 Rhode Island
- 2008–09 Massachusetts
- 2009–10 Rhode Island
- 2010–11 Northeastern
- 2011–12 Penn State
- 2012–13 Massachusetts
- 2013–14 Rhode Island
- 2014–15 Massachusetts
- 2015–16 Rhode Island
- 2016–17 Massachusetts
- 2017–18 Rhode Island
- 2018–19 Massachusetts
- 2019–20 Massachusetts

== ACHA National Tournament appearances ==
Appearances made while an ECWHL member. Former conference members are in italics.

School	Appearances	Years	Championships
Massachusetts	15	2005, 2006, 2007, 2008, 2009, 2010, 2011, 2012, 2013, 2014, 2015, 2016, 2017, 2018, 2020	None
Rhode Island	12	2004, 2005, 2006, 2007, 2008, 2009, 2010, 2011, 2012, 2013, 2014, 2016	None
Penn State	4	2004, 2007, 2010, 2015	None
Northeastern	3	2011, 2012, 2013	2012
Buffalo	1	2005	None
Connecticut	1	2007	None
Norwich	1	2007	None

== World University Games selections ==
Since 2011, the American Collegiate Hockey Association has supplied players for the United States team at the World University Games women's hockey tournament, held biennially and as part of the multi-sport event for college and university student-athletes.

Year	Location	Player	School	Result
2011	Erzurum, Turkey	Mo Stroemel (head coach)	Penn State	Fourth Place
2011	Erzurum, Turkey	Justine Ducie	Rhode Island	Fourth Place
2011	Erzurum, Turkey	Lindsay Reihl	Penn State	Fourth Place
2011	Erzurum, Turkey	Denise Rohlik	Penn State	Fourth Place
2011	Erzurum, Turkey	Heather Rossi	Penn State	Fourth Place
2011	Erzurum, Turkey	Katie Vaughan	Penn State	Fourth Place
2011	Erzurum, Turkey	Megan Winters	Northeastern	Fourth Place
2013	Trentino, Italy	Amanda Abromson	Massachusetts	Bronze Medal
2013	Trentino, Italy	Cassie Catlow	Rhode Island	Bronze Medal
2013	Trentino, Italy	Chelsea Corell	Massachusetts	Bronze Medal
2013	Trentino, Italy	Alisha DiFilippo	Rhode Island	Bronze Medal
2013	Trentino, Italy	Paige Harrington	Massachusetts	Bronze Medal
2013	Trentino, Italy	Lauren Hillberg	Rhode Island	Bronze Medal
2013	Trentino, Italy	Caleigh LaBossiere	Massachusetts	Bronze Medal
2013	Trentino, Italy	Sarah Oteri	Massachusetts	Bronze Medal
2015	Granada, Spain	Amanda Abromson	Massachusetts	Fifth Place
2015	Granada, Spain	Vicki Bortolussi	Massachusetts	Fifth Place
2015	Granada, Spain	Cassie Catlow	Rhode Island	Fifth Place
2015	Granada, Spain	Emily Ford	Vermont	Fifth Place
2015	Granada, Spain	Paige Harrington	Massachusetts	Fifth Place
2015	Granada, Spain	Caleigh LaBossiere	Massachusetts	Fifth Place
2015	Granada, Spain	Kristen Levesque	Rhode Island	Fifth Place
2015	Granada, Spain	Madison Smiddy	Penn State	Fifth Place
2017	Almaty, Kazakhstan	Cassie Dunne	Penn State	Bronze Medal
2017	Almaty, Kazakhstan	Amber Greene	Massachusetts	Bronze Medal
2017	Almaty, Kazakhstan	Brittani Lanzilli	Massachusetts	Bronze Medal

== Notable ACHA award winners ==
Year	Winner	School	Award
2004–05	Beth McCann	Rhode Island	Coach of the Year
2007–08	Beth McCann	Rhode Island	Coach of the Year
2008–09	Maura Grainger	Massachusetts	Zoë M. Harris Player of the Year
2009–10	Hayley Kuhn	Massachusetts	Off-Ice Most Valuable Player
2010–11	Nick Carpenito	Northeastern	Coach of the Year
2010–11	Danika Korpacz	Rhode Island	Off-Ice Most Valuable Player
2010–11	Sara Chroman	Penn State	Community Playmaker
2011–12	Chelsea Dietz	Northeastern	ACHA Tournament MVP
2011–12	Sam Gouin	Massachusetts	Off-Ice Most Valuable Player
2012–13	Cassie Catlow	Rhode Island	Zoë M. Harris Player of the Year
2013–14	Stephanie Hyde	Canton	Community Playmaker
2013–14	Sam Gouin	Massachusetts	Community Playmaker
2015–16	Brittani Lanzilli	Massachusetts	Zoë M. Harris Player of the Year
2016–17	Kelly Watson	Penn State	Community Playmaker
2016–17	Rhode Island		Team Community Service Award
2019–20	Bill Wright	Massachusetts	Coach of the Year

== See also ==
- American Collegiate Hockey Association
- Penn State Women's Ice Hockey Club
- Rhode Island Rams women's ice hockey
- UMass Minutemen women's ice hockey
- List of ice hockey leagues
