= Rhode Island Rams women's ice hockey =

American sports team

- University: University of Rhode Island
- Conference: Eastern Collegiate Women's Hockey League
- Governing Body: ACHA Women's Division 1
- Head coach: Ashley Pagliarini; 3rd season, 57–36–5
- Assistant coaches: Richard Torres, Tom McCormick
- Arena: Bradford R. Boss Arena; Kingston, Rhode Island
- Colors: Keaney blue, navy blue, and white

ACHA tournament appearances
- 2004, 2005, 2006, 2007, 2008, 2009, 2010, 2011, 2012, 2013, 2014, 2016

Conference tournament champions
- ECWHL: 2004, 2005, 2006, 2007, 2008, 2009, 2010, 2012, 2014

Conference regular season champions
- ECWHL: 2004, 2005, 2006, 2007, 2008, 2010, 2014, 2016, 2018

Current uniform
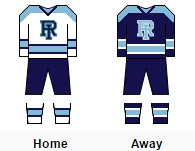

The Rhode Island Rams women's ice hockey team represents the University of Rhode Island (URI) in Women's Division 1 of the American Collegiate Hockey Association (ACHA). Since the team's 1999 inauguration, the Rams have been one of the most successful programs in intercollegiate women's ice hockey, winning nine regular season and nine playoff titles in the 15-year existence of the Eastern Collegiate Women's Hockey League, both ECWHL records. The Rams have also qualified for 12 of the 18 ACHA National Tournaments held for women's teams, a number that trails only Massachusetts, Michigan and Michigan State. Highlighting Rhode Island's 12 ACHA tournament bids are eight semifinal appearances, including five in a row from 2004 through 2008. The team's present coach, Ashley Pagliarini, was a standout defenseman at URI from 2004 through 2009 and is just the second head coach in team history, taking over for program founder Beth McCann for the 2014–15 season.

== History ==
=== Early years (1999–2003) ===
The first women's teams at URI, typical of a new program, lost more games than they won, posting a 6–33–1 mark from the inaugural 1999–2000 season through 2001–02. For the team's first four years, it primarily used the West Warwick Ice Rink in West Warwick, Rhode Island - roughly a half hour drive from campus - as its home facility. Early schedules featured a mix of top club programs of the day, as well as junior varsity teams from NCAA Division I schools and NCAA Division III teams. Rhode Island's 2000–01 schedule, for example, included future ECWHL opponents Boston University, Massachusetts and Penn State from the first category, alongside the JV team from Brown and DIII's Salve Regina. The Rams' sole victory that year came against the Providence Lady Reds program.

In the 2001–02 season, URI became a member of the ACHA Women's Division (later ACHA Women's Division 1) in its second year of existence, as the organization provided much-needed structure, regulation and a national championship tournament for non-varsity women's college hockey. The Rams' 5–12–0 record in 2001–02 merited a final ranking of fourth in the East Region (at the time, the ACHA was split into three regions, with the top two from each receiving national tournament bids, along with two wild card selections). An improved team in 2002–03 achieved its first winning mark at 10–7–3, boosting the program to a near-miss for the ACHA National Tournament at third in the East Region. The Rams' stars in their formative years included Marina Riva and Lauren Marx, each of whom ranked among the top ten nationally in 2002–03 scoring. Marina Riva won the leading scorer award for the team in the 2002–03 season with 20 goals and 15 assists for a total of 35 points. Forward Heather Scherick became the first in URI's long line of ACHA award winners by earning All-American Honorable Mention that season.

The $12 million, 2,500-seat Bradford R. Boss Arena, which finally gave the Rams a top on-campus facility and would prove instrumental to the program's growth in the years that followed, opened in the fall of 2002.

=== Exploding on the scene (2003–2004) ===
Although the Rams showed steady improvement over their first four years, there really wasn't much indication of what would follow in season five: an immediate and decisive ascension into one of the nation's best programs, a status that continues to the present day.

Coinciding with this development was the advent of the ECWHL thanks to the efforts of McCann, who also served as the league's first commissioner. Buffalo, Penn State, Massachusetts and Boston University stood as URI's conference rivals in 2003–04.

Rhode Island served notice of the shift immediately, taking 15 of the first 16 games on the schedule. Notable among the results were a 4–2 win over NCAA Division I Sacred Heart on October 26, 2003, behind Robin Rosselle, who scored twice and assisted on the other two Rhody tallies. Win 15 of that opening salvo came on January 9, 2004, by a 4–3 score against defending national champion Michigan State. The next week, URI finished second at the UMass White Out Tournament, an invitational packed with powerhouses like the hosting Minutewomen, West Los Angeles College, Colorado and Robert Morris (IL), before thoroughly dominating the schedule's home stretch. Against Buffalo, Penn State, Bates College, UMass and Saint Anselm, the Rams went 9–0–0 and scored 50 times while only surrendering 11 goals. A 2–2 draw with NCAA Division III Holy Cross closed out the regular season.

Driving the team's success were a bevy of top players, some familiar, some new. Riva, Marx and Scherick were all still around, as was Jen Wallace, already well on her way to putting together one of the most spectacular careers in team history by that point. Rosselle headlined a stellar group of freshman that also included Alysa Coleman, Karen Hawes and Lynn Pecci, who would become a mainstay in the Rams' crease during the middle part of the decade. Wallace (33 goals, 26 assists) and Hawes (20 goals, 27 assists) finished first and second in the national scoring race, while Scherick, Rosselle, Riva and Marx also placed highly on the list.

In the first-ever ECWHL playoffs, hosted at Boss Arena, Rhody was just as dominant as during its 8–0–0 league regular season, dispatching BU (7–2) and UMass (9–2) to win the title and lock down the national number three ranking into the ACHA National Tournament. Things started well in East Lansing, MI as URI took first in its pool and made the semifinals with decisive wins over West LA and Iowa State, before taking down MSU for the second time in 2003–04 during the final four round. The dream season - which resulted in a program-best 32 wins - came to a disappointing end one victory shy however, as Wisconsin topped the Rams 3–1 in the ACHA championship clash.

=== A dynasty without a title (2004–2008) ===
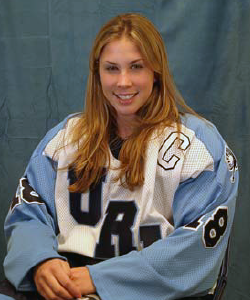
Three-time ACHA All-American Jen Wallace

The spectacular 2003–04 season was hardly a one-off affair as URI recharged with another great incoming class, headlined by Pagliarini and goaltender Kelly Jourdain, while retaining most of its core. A steady flow of other program legends like Kate Garcia (2005–09), Jolene Rambone (2006–10), Justine Ducie (2007–11) and Meghan Birnie (2008-12) arriving in subsequent seasons ensured that the Rams remained in constant contention. Helsinki, Finland native Johanna Leskinen (2008–12) was also part of that progression, and would go on to become the program's all-time leading scorer with 116 goals and 188 points in 112 games. Appropriately, given the caliber of players wearing Keaney blue, the Rams won every single regular season and playoff title for the first five years of the ECWHL's existence and cemented their status as the northeast's dominant team by taking the top spot in the East or Northeast Region (as applicable) in 24 of the 27 regional rankings issued between 2003–04 and 2009–10, after which the regional poll was discontinued.

Rhody's success translated on a national scale as well, as McCann collected a pair of ACHA coach of the year awards in 2004–05 and 2007–08. Both came during a stretch that saw her team qualify for the ACHA semifinals in five consecutive seasons, from the runner-up finish of 2003–04 through 2007–08, when defending national champion Robert Morris (IL) took out the Rams in the final four round. The latter result was part of a disheartening trend: while Rhode Island was great, it just couldn't manage to scale two of the other dominant programs of the time. Lindenwood, which beat URI in the 2007 semifinals, won the 2006, 2008, 2009 and 2010 national titles while RMU, which knocked URI out of nationals in 2005, 2006 and 2008 were the champs in 2005 and 2007 (the Lions and Eagles, in fact, went head to head in the title game to end four straight seasons, from 2006 through 2009). The Rams' run in the 2006 tournament was among the team's closest calls since the 2004 title game, as Chelsea Skorupski and Emily Tuohey put Rhode Island up 2–0 on RMU in the semis before a natural hat trick from 2006–07 Zoë M. Harris Award winner Savannah Varner flipped the result to 3–2 for the Eagles.

In 2007–08, URI had another of the program's best seasons, as the Rams tore through their ACHA regular season schedule unbeaten at 19–0–2 (part of a 19–5–3 overall regular season mark that also included six contests against NCAA teams). Included in that run, most impressively, was a 4–1 win against Lindenwood at Boss Arena on November 16, 2007, behind two points from Emily Gasper and goals by Ducie and Pagliarini. Three months later, Ducie would strike again - in triple overtime against UMass - to give Rhody a fifth consecutive ECWHL tournament title on February 24, 2008. Rhode Island subsequently plowed through Michigan, Northern Michigan and Minnesota to open nationals in Bensenville, Illinois, before seeing its ACHA unbeaten streak end at 28 games with a 3–1 loss to host school Robert Morris (IL) in the semifinals.

Carrying a tag like "The Best Team to Never Win a National Title" with finishes in second place (once), fourth place (once) and third place (three times) over a five-year span is certainly a mixed bag, but Rhode Island could at least take solace in its eastern dominance. The team went 51–1–3 within the ECWHL from 2003–08, with a season sweep of a nationals-qualifying Penn State team by 9–1 and 8–1 scores in 2006–07 standing as one glaring example of the separation between the Rams and most of the rest of the league during the middle part of the 21st century's first decade.

=== Mounting challenges, continued success (2008–2014) ===
Increasingly, as the ECWHL neared its tenth birthday, Rhode Island saw its hegemony at the top of the league challenged. The 2008–09 season featured a team besides URI win an ECWHL regular season or playoff title for the first time ever in the form of Massachusetts, which finished in first place during the regular season. Northeastern, fresh off of a 2010 national championship in ACHA Division II, joined Division I and the ECWHL and were a strong contender during their first years in the league. In 2010–11, the Huskies became the first team other than the Rams to win the ECWHL's playoff championship with a 6–5 win over URI at Boss Arena, while also taking the regular season crown by a single point over Rhode Island to shut the Ocean Staters out of both ECWHL titles for the first time ever. NU added insult to injury the next season by claiming the ACHA national championship that had long eluded the Rams in just its second Division I campaign.

Despite the heightened competition within the league, URI more than held their own by winning four playoff and two regular season ECWHL titles over six years from 2008–09 through 2013–14, a combined total doubling that of UMass, the next highest team. All the while, the Rams continued running off ACHA National Tournament appearances, compiling a streak of 11 consecutive bids through 2013–14 - a number that has only been surpassed in ACHA history by UMass (14, 2005–18) and Michigan State (13, 2002–14). The national title-related frustration continued as well though, as Rhode Island continued to run into teams of destiny at the tourney. In 2009–10, the Lindenwood dynasty again presented a wall too high in the semifinals, while ascending Northeastern posed the same problem the following year and 2012–13 champion Minnesota blocked URI in the pool stage that time around.

Following disappointingly short ACHA tournament runs in the springs of 2012 and 2013, McCann assembled one of her strongest teams in 2013–14. That squad featured a Zoë M. Harris Player of the Year Award winner (Cassie Catlow in 2012–13), four players picked for World University Games teams (Catlow in both 2013 and 2015, Alisha DiFilippo in 2013, Lauren Hillberg in 2013 and Kristen Levesque in 2015) and six players who would be picked as first or second team All-Americans at some point during their careers (Catlow, DiFilippo, Hillberg, Brenna Callahan, Sydney Collins and Kayla DiLorenzo). With the talent cupboards again fully loaded, the Rams took both ECWHL championships for the first time since 2009–10 by shutting out both Vermont and UMass in the playoffs. URI carried the third seed to the ACHA National Tournament in Newark, Delaware, and went unbeaten in the pool round (including a tie with eventual national champion Miami), qualifying for the semifinals for the first time in three years. However, the Minutewomen exacted revenge for the ECWHL title and ousted Rhody there by a 2–1 score.

=== Tumult and resurgence (2014–present) ===
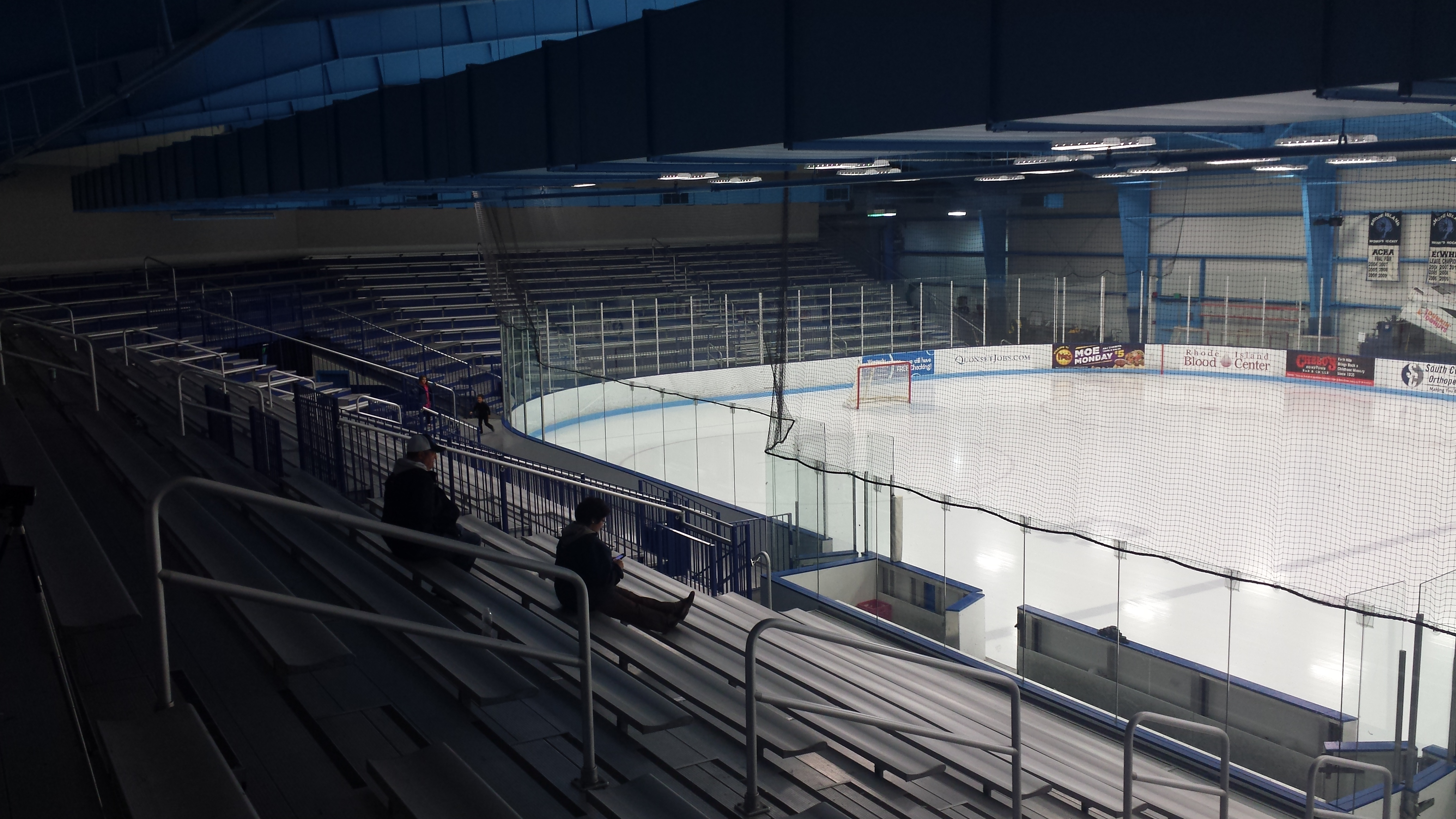
Bradford R. Boss Arena has been the Rams' home since it opened in 2002

McCann, by 2014 ACHA's longest-tenured coach by a wide margin, surprisingly did not have her contract renewed by the team that summer, which ended her 15-year run with a 304–128–26 overall record. In McCann's place stepped one of her former star players, 2009 graduate Pagliarini, who had been coaching the Cranston Thunderbirds (a high school co-op team combining players from Cranston High School East, Cranston High School West and East Greenwich High School). Following Pagliarini's first season at the helm in 2014–15, URI student paper The Good 5 Cent Cigar reported that both ends of the coaching change were far from unanimous decisions within the team - the player vote against keeping McCann was 11–10, while the replacement search committee was similarly divided on Pagliarini - and largely blamed on the abrasive behavior of the former coach's husband Tracy, who had also been on the staff. The 2014–15 season started well, with the Rams moving into the ACHA's top five and highlighted by a 4–3 come-from-behind overtime win at second-ranked Liberty, which gave the eventual national champion Flames their first loss. Just two days after the big win, however, a coach-player disagreement at practice resulted in All-American goaltender DiLorenzo being kicked off the team, while two other players also left the squad during the season. Notably, DiLorenzo was the Rams' only goaltender, which forced star forward/defenseman Collins to log 440 minutes in net until a late-season replacement was found. Although the Rams largely survived the rough patch and finished with a 21–11–1 overall record while reaching the ECWHL championship game, a blowout loss to Massachusetts in that final and narrowly missing out on the ACHA National Tournament for the first time since 2003 brought the campaign to a bitter close.

By her second year in charge, Pagliarini managed to stabilize things, as senior tri-captains Collins, DiFilippo and Callahan, along with classmate Levesque, dominated the ACHA scoring charts. Callahan, with 29 points, was the second-highest-scoring defenseman in ACHA Division 1, while Collins (49 points), DiFilippo (43) and Levesque (38) ranked fourth, seventh and ninth among all DI players. Thanks largely to the four goals per game average those players helped produce, URI returned to national prominence with an eighth ECWHL regular season championship and a 12th bid to the ACHA National Tournament. The following season, 2016–17, despite breakout years from Monica Darby (43 points, good for third in the nation) and rookie Madison Balutowski (28 goals, also third), URI narrowly missed nationals for the second time in three years.

==== Rumors of NCAA status ====
The continued national success of the Rams, along with URI's men's team and Rhode Island's status as the only New England state without NCAA Division I hockey at its flagship university, has led to frequent rumors of the school adding men's and women's hockey as varsity sports. Most of these began with the completion of Boss Arena, a facility considered capable of hosting NCAA hockey, in 2002, an occasion that led to then-athletic director Ron Petro to openly research the concept. Petro told college hockey news site USCHO that "During [the last academic] year, the president [of URI] asked for a survey, so I talked to people from Hockey East, the ECAC and the MAAC as to URI - if we were able to fund it - getting into a league. I made a recommendation to the president in April, but we've been hit with budget cuts as most people have been, so we've delayed any decision on that until we can get a better hold on how to finance a Division I hockey program for men and women, which we know would be way over a million dollars. We are the only state university in New England that doesn't support a team. That would be a goal of mine in the future, but it all comes down to funding." More recently, a wave of conference realignment in NCAA hockey between 2012 and 2014 led to DI men's league Atlantic Hockey maintaining a less-than-ideal odd number of members, 11. Rhode Island's men were involved in discussions to join Atlantic Hockey, with the women possibly receiving varsity status as well by joining AHC's sister league, College Hockey America. However, in September 2014, athletic director Thorr Bjorn torpedoed things by flatly stating that the school "isn't currently looking at adding varsity hockey to our slate of offered sports." Nevertheless, Rhode Island is frequently mentioned by fans and writers as a candidate for NCAA expansion on a more informal basis.

== Season-by-season results ==
Won Championship	Lost Championship	Regular Season Conference Champions

Year	Coach	W	L	T	Conference	Conf. W	Conf. L	Conf. T	Finish	Conference Tournament	ACHA Tournament
2016–17	Ashley Pagliarini	18	12	1	ECWHL	12	3	1	2nd	Won Semifinals vs. Penn State (5–1); Lost Championship vs. Massachusetts (0–3)	Did not qualify
2015–16	Ashley Pagliarini	18	13	3	ECWHL	12	2	2	1st	Won Semifinals vs. Penn State (7–0); Lost Championship vs. Massachusetts (3–4)	Lost Pool Round vs. Miami (2–5); Lost Pool Round vs. Adrian (3–7); Won Pool Round vs. Massachusetts (5–2)
2014–15	Ashley Pagliarini	21	11	1	ECWHL	12	3	1	2nd	Won Semifinals vs. Penn State (4–1); Lost Championship vs. Massachusetts (2–7)	Did not qualify
2013–14	Beth McCann	23	11	4	ECWHL	10	4	0	1st	Won Semifinals vs. Vermont (4–0); Won Championship vs. Massachusetts (2–0)	Won Pool Round vs. Michigan (4–1); Won Pool Round vs. Michigan State (4–3); Tied Pool Round vs. Miami (1–1 OT); Lost Semifinals vs. Massachusetts (1–2); Lost Third Place vs. Liberty (1–2 OT)
2012–13	Beth McCann				ECWHL				2nd	Lost Semifinals vs. Northeastern (2–3); Won Third Place vs. SUNY Canton (7–0)	Lost Pool Round vs. Minnesota (0–4); Lost Pool Round vs. Liberty (0–6); Lost Pool Round vs. Michigan (2–4)
2011–12	Beth McCann				ECWHL	7	3	0	2nd	Won Semifinals vs. Northeastern (3–1); Won Championship vs. Penn State (4–1)	Won Pool Round vs. Michigan (5–1); Tied Pool Round vs. Massachusetts (1–1 OT); Lost Pool Round vs. Robert Morris (IL) (0–2)
2010–11	Beth McCann				ECWHL	5	1	2	2nd	Won Semifinals vs. Penn State (7–2); Lost Championship vs. Northeastern (5–6)	Won Pool Round vs. Grand Valley State (6–1); Won Pool Round vs. Michigan (6–3); Lost Pool Round vs. Lindenwood (3–4); Lost Semifinals vs. Northeastern (0–4); Lost Third Place vs. Lindenwood (0–6)
2009–10	Beth McCann	18^{†}	11	3	ECWHL	9	1	0	1st	Data Not Available	Won Pool Round vs. Liberty (4–2); Won Pool Round vs. Penn State (5–0); Lost Pool Round vs. Robert Morris (IL) (3–4); Lost Semifinals vs. Lindenwood (0–5); Lost Third Place vs. Robert Morris (IL) (1–3)
2008–09	Beth McCann				ECWHL					Won Semifinals vs. Penn State (4–1); Won Championship vs. Massachusetts (4–1)	Lost Pool Round vs. Liberty (3–4); Won Pool Round vs. Grand Valley State (6–1); Lost Quarterfinals vs. Michigan State (1–2)
2007–08	Beth McCann	26	6	3	ECWHL	7	0	1	1st	Won Semifinals vs. Connecticut (8–0); Won Championship vs. Massachusetts (5–4 3OT)	Won Pool Round vs. Michigan (3–2); Won Pool Round vs. Northern Michigan (9–1); Won Quarterfinals vs. Minnesota (6–2); Lost Semifinals vs. Robert Morris (IL) (1–3); Won Third Place vs. Massachusetts (3–1)
2006–07	Beth McCann	23	9	1	ECWHL	13	0	1	1st	Won Exhibition vs. Nichols^{‡} (11–1); Won Championship vs. Norwich (3–1)	Won Pool Round vs. Western Michigan (4–0); Won Pool Round vs. Norwich (3–2); Won Quarterfinals vs. Massachusetts (1–0); Lost Semifinals vs. Lindenwood (1–6); Won Third Place vs. Connecticut (4–2)
2005–06	Beth McCann	29	8	2	ECWHL	11	1	0	1st	Won Semifinals vs. Buffalo (6–0); Won Championship vs. Massachusetts (4–1)	Won Pool Round vs. Connecticut (7–3); Won Pool Round vs. Minnesota (3–1); Won Quarterfinals vs. Michigan (5–1); Lost Semifinals vs. Robert Morris (IL) (2–3); Won Third Place vs. Michigan State (4–3)
2004–05	Beth McCann	23	11	3	ECWHL	12	0	1	1st	Won Semifinals vs. Penn State (6–1); Won Championship vs. Massachusetts (5–4 OT)	Won Pool Round vs. Western Michigan (7–2); Won Pool Round vs. Minnesota (3–2 OT); Won Quarterfinals vs. North Country CC (6–0); Lost Semifinals vs. Robert Morris (IL) (0–4); Lost Third Place vs. Colorado (1–2)
2003–04	Beth McCann	32	5	2	ECWHL	8	0	0	1st	Won Semifinals vs. Boston University (7–2); Won Championship vs. Massachusetts (9–2)	Won Pool Round vs. West Los Angeles College (5–1); Won Pool Round vs. Iowa State (4–0); Won Semifinals vs. Michigan State (3–1); Lost Championship vs. Wisconsin (1–3)
2002–03	Beth McCann	10	7	3	Independent	-	-	-	-	None	Did not qualify
2001–02	Beth McCann	5	12	0	Independent	-	-	-	-	None	Did not qualify
2000–01	Beth McCann	1	14	1	Independent	-	-	-	-	None	Not an ACHA member
1999–00	Beth McCann	0	7	0	Independent	-	-	-	-	None	Tournament did not exist

† Rhode Island was the 2009–10 ECWHL playoff champion, which likely means that the Rams won at least two additional games that season beyond the 18 counted, however game scores for those playoffs are not available.

‡ In the 2007 ECWHL playoffs, Rhode Island was originally scheduled to play Penn State in the semifinal round. However, PSU was unable to travel to the playoffs, resulting in a forfeit and URI's automatic advancement to the championship game. A game against non-ECWHL member Nichols was added as a fill-in during the scheduled semifinal.

== Program records ==
As of April 14, 2016. ACHA games only, beginning with the 2003-04 season.

=== Career scoring leaders ===
Name	Years	Games	Goals	Assists	Points
Johanna Leskinen	2008–12	112	116	72	188
Alisha DiFilippo	2011–16	145	97	80	177
Jolene Rambone	2006–10	108	90	68	158
Jen Wallace	2003–06^	92	77	68	145
Ashley Pagliarini	2004–09	137	64	74	138
Cassie Catlow	2011–15	115	63	65	128
Kate Garcia	2005–09	112	62	66	128
Meghan Birnie	2008–12	112	46	81	127
Sydney Collins	2011–16	142	64	57	121
Justine Ducie	2007–11	103	59	61	120
Karen Hawes	2003–07	115	46	74	120
Robin Rosselle	2003–06	90	47	69	116
Kristy Kennedy	2011–15	123	57	58	115
Marina Riva	2002–06^	91	57	57	114
Kayla Robidoux	2009–12	89	41	57	98
Lauren Hillberg	2009–14	136	33	63	96
Monica Darby	2014–present	85	52	43	95
Janessa Courtney	2013–17	110	37	57	94
Chelsea Skorupski	2004–08	112	46	46	92
Kristen Levesque	2012–16	107	45	46	91
Lauren Lanoie	2010–14	125	44	47	91
Nicole Ouellette	2006–10	107	44	41	85
Cara Murphy	2005–07	61	39	35	74
Amanda Tassoni	2007–11	100	15	57	72
Brenna Callahan	2012–16	120	18	52	70

^ Career includes games prior to the 2003–04 season.

=== Single season scoring leaders ===
Name	Year	Games	Goals	Assists	Points
Marina Riva	2002–03	20	20	15	35
Jen Wallace	2003–04	31	33	26	59
Jolene Rambone	2008–09	25	34	19	53
Johanna Leskinen	2009–10	27	28	22	50
Kristy Kennedy	2014–15	28	27	23	50
Kate Garcia	2007–08	27	23	27	50
Sydney Collins	2015–16	30	28	21	49
Johanna Leskinen	2011–12	31	31	17	48
Johanna Leskinen	2010–11	29	35	12	47
Karen Hawes	2003–04	30	20	27	47
Jolene Rambone	2007–08	27	21	24	45
Robin Rosselle	2005–06	34	16	29	45
Alisha DiFilippo	2013–14	32	22	22	44
Jen Wallace	2004–05	27	21	23	44
Heather Scherick	2003–04	25	19	25	44
Alisha DiFilippo	2015–16	30	25	18	43
Monica Darby	2016–17	27	23	20	43
Cassie Catlow	2012–13	29	23	20	43
Johanna Leskinen	2008–09	25	22	21	43
Jen Wallace	2005–06	34	23	19	42
Cara Murphy	2005–06	34	21	21	42
Madison Balutowski	2016–17	27	28	13	41
Emily Tuohey	2005–06	34	23	18	41
Meghan Birnie	2010–11	28	12	29	41
Ashley Pagliarini	2004–05	27	26	14	40
Kayla Robidoux	2009–10	28	21	17	38
Kristen Levesque	2015–16	28	15	23	38
Ashley Pagliarini	2005–06	34	11	27	38

=== Notable goaltenders ===
Name	Years	Minutes	Saves	Save Pct.	GAA	Shutouts
Kayla DiLorenzo	2010–15	6093.02	2262	0.933	1.61	22
Nina Goncarovs	2008–11^{+}	4161.10	1391	0.901	2.21	8
Abigail Torres	2015–present	2548.72	1008	0.910	2.35	5
Lynn Pecci	2003–06^{+}	2108.00	703	0.907	2.05	4
Kelly Jourdain	2004–06	1717.30	516	0.928	1.40	6
Sarah Ross	2012–13, 2014–15	936.63	266	0.881	2.95	0
Katelyn Bucior	2015–17	770.63	158	0.845	2.65	2
Megan McGhie	2009–12	478.67	132	0.904	1.75	2
Sydney Collins	2011–16	440.00	129	0.854	3.00	0
Lauren Meyer	2003–04	392.00	85	0.944	0.77	4
Chelsea Keach	2008–09	380.00	59	0.894	1.11	2
Keri Houhoulis	2005–06^{+}	180.00	28	0.875	1.33	0
Audrey Wingate	2003–04^	162.00	52	0.963	0.74	1
Lizzy Bell	2016–present	160.00	50	0.926	1.50	0

^ Career includes games prior to the 2003–04 season.

+ Career includes games in the 2006–07 and/or 2007–08 seasons, during which the ACHA did not accurately track goaltending statistics.

== ACHA ranking history ==
=== National rankings ===
The ACHA began compiling a national ranking in 2003–04, issued four times per season, with the top twelve (from 2003–04 through 2008–09) or eight (from 2009–10 on) in the fourth ranking, released in February, receiving a bid to the ACHA National Tournament. A preseason ranking was initiated beginning with 2014–15. Beginning with the 2016–17 season, the ACHA tabulated rankings each week during the season and issued them on Tuesdays following weekends including games.

Year	Ranking																	
Year	Pre	1	2	3	4	5	6	7	8	9	10	11	12	13	14	15	16	17
2003–04		2	2	3	3													
2004–05		2	3	4	4													
2005–06		6	5	4	4													
2006–07		2	3	4	4													
2007–08		3	2	2	2													
2008–09		1	1	3	3													
2009–10		6	4	3	3													
2010–11		4	3	3	3													
2011–12		5	5	2	3													
2012–13		1	3	3	6													
2013–14		2	2	3	3													
2014–15	5	4	3	7	8													
2015–16	5	5	6	7	7													
2016–17	7	8	11	13	11	10	6	8	9	10	10	10	11	10	8	9	9	10
2017–18	10	11	11	11	11	15	15	14	13	13	13	12	12	12	12	11	11	

=== Regional rankings ===
From 2000–01 through 2002–03, regional rankings were the sole method for determining ACHA National Tournament bids. The inaugural 2000–01 season (which did not include Rhode Island) featured teams divided into East and West Regions, with the top four from each in February's final ranking invited to nationals. For 2001–02 and 2002–03, the setup was expanded to include East, Central and West Regions. Under that system, the top two from each region were invited to nationals, along with two wild card teams. In 2003–04, the tournament field was expanded to 12 teams, and a national ranking was introduced. The latter development diminished the importance of the regional rankings, as the national rankings were used to determine nationals bids. Regional champions were still awarded an autobid, however, even if ranked outside of the top 12 nationally. In 2004–05, growth in the number of ACHA women's teams resulted in an increase to four regions - Northeast, Southeast, Central and West - although things reverted to East, Central and West in 2007–08. The 2009–10 season was notable both for the fact that the tournament field was reduced back to eight teams and as the final year of the regional system, which had become largely antiquated as regional champions generally had little issue placing highly in the national rankings.

Year	Ranking				
Year	1	2	3	4	5
2000–01	Not an ACHA member				
2001–02	3E	4E	4E	4E	4E
2002–03	2E	2E	3E	3E	
2003–04	1E	1E	1E	1E	
2004–05	1NE	1NE	1NE	1NE	
2005–06	3NE	2NE	1NE	1NE	
2006–07	1NE	1NE	1NE	1NE	
2007–08	1E	1E	1E	1E	
2008–09	1E	2E	1E	1E	
2009–10	1E	1E	1E		

== ACHA national honors ==
=== Annual awards ===
All-Americans and All-Tournament selections including all seasons except 2008–09. Academic All-Americans including all seasons except 2007–08 and 2008–09.

Zoë M. Harris Player of the Year

- Cassie Catlow - 2012–13

Coach of the Year

- Beth McCann - 2004–05, 2007–08

Off-Ice Most Valuable Player

- Danika Korpacz - 2010–11

Community Service Award

- 2016–17 (team award)

Academic All-American

- Jen Wallace - 2003–04, 2004–05, 2005–06
- Amelia Lyman - 2004–05
- Kellie Bartram - 2005–06
- Michelle Paquin - 2009–10
- Justine Ducie - 2009–10, 2010–11
- Nina Goncarovs - 2009–10, 2010–11
- Kristen Levesque - 2015–16
- Caitlin McGuirl - 2016–17, 2017–18
- Leah Hoder - 2016–17
- Samantha Evans - 2016–17, 2017–18
- Brynne Costa - 2017–18
- Jillian Holden - 2017–18

First Team All-American

- Jen Wallace - 2003–04, 2004–05, 2005–06
- Robin Rosselle - 2003–04, 2004–05, 2005–06
- Kate Garcia - 2007–08
- Lynn Pecci - 2007–08
- Jolene Rambone - 2009–10
- Johanna Leskinen - 2011–12
- Kayla Robidoux - 2011–12
- Lauren Hillberg - 2012–13
- Kayla DiLorenzo - 2013–14
- Sydney Collins - 2015–16

Second Team All-American

- Lynn Pecci - 2003–04, 2006–07
- Ashley Pagliarini - 2004–05
- Cara Murphy - 2005–06, 2006–07
- Amanda Tassoni - 2010–11
- Meghan Birnie - 2011–12
- Alisha DiFilippo - 2012–13, 2013–14
- Lauren Hillberg - 2013–14
- Brenna Callahan - 2015–16

All-American Honorable Mention

- Heather Scherick - 2002–03
- Kate Garcia - 2006–07
- Jolene Rambone - 2007–08
- Emily Gasper - 2007–08

First Team All-Tournament

- Jen Wallace - 2003–04
- Robin Rosselle - 2003–04, 2005–06
- Lynn Pecci - 2003–04, 2007–08
- Ashley Pagliarini - 2004–05
- Kate Garcia - 2007–08
- Emily Gasper - 2007–08
- Jolene Rambone - 2009–10

Second Team All-Tournament

- Robin Rosselle - 2004–05
- Emily Tuohey - 2005–06
- Laura Braddock - 2005–06
- Ashley Pagliarini - 2006–07
- Cara Murphy - 2006–07
- Amanda Tassoni - 2009–10
- Johanna Leskinen - 2010–11, 2011–12
- Lauren Hillberg - 2010–11, 2013–14
- Lauren Lanoie - 2013–14

All-Tournament Honorable Mention

- Alysa Coleman - 2003–04
- Heather Scherick - 2003–04
- Jen Wallace - 2004–05
- Allison Kelley - 2004–05
- Kelly Jourdain - 2004–05, 2005–06
- Kate Garcia - 2005–06
- Cara Murphy - 2005–06
- Nicole Ouellette - 2006–07
- Ashley Pagliarini - 2007–08
- Jolene Rambone - 2007–08
- Kristen Leach - 2007–08

=== Monthly awards ===
During the 2013–14, 2014–15 and 2015–16 seasons, the ACHA presented a series of monthly awards for both men's and women's divisions.

Harrow Player of the Month

- Alisha DiFilippo – January 2014

Harrow Defenseman of the Month

- Lauren Hillberg – November 2013, January 2014

Warrior Goaltender of the Month

- Kayla DiLorenzo – November 2013, January 2014

== World University Games selections ==
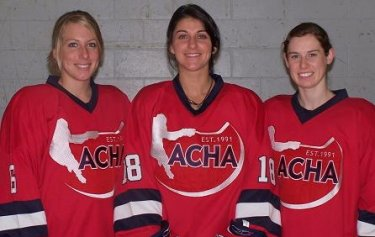
Jolene Rambone (center) captained the 2010 ACHA Women's Select Team

Since 2011, the ACHA has supplied players for the U.S. National University Select Women's Team, which competes at the World University Games women's hockey tournament, held biennially and as part of the multi-sport event for college and university student-athletes. Five different Rhode Island players have been picked for Team USA a total of six times. The 2013 contingent, including defenseman Lauren Hillberg and forwards Alisha DiFilippo and Cassie Catlow, made history as members of the just the second American squad in history to win a WUG medal by taking the bronze (a men's Team USA also won bronze in 1972, although they did so by finishing third in a three-team tournament), and the first group of women or men to do so since the ACHA began stocking the teams, an era that began in 2001 on the men's side. Both DiFilippo and Catlow scored in one of the team's biggest wins, a 4–2 victory over a Russian squad featuring Anna Prugova, Yekaterina Nikolayeva, Anna Shukina, and several others who have played for the senior Russia women's national ice hockey team. Catlow, in particular, starred during the tournament, posting two goals and four assists in seven games to finish tied for second on the squad in scoring.

Year	Location	Player	Result
2011	Erzurum, Turkey	(United States) Justine Ducie	Fourth Place
2013	Trentino, Italy	(United States) Cassie Catlow	Bronze Medal
2013	Trentino, Italy	(United States) Alisha DiFilippo	Bronze Medal
2013	Trentino, Italy	(United States) Lauren Hillberg	Bronze Medal
2015	Granada, Spain	(United States) Cassie Catlow	Fifth Place
2015	Granada, Spain	(United States) Kristen Levesque	Fifth Place

=== 2010 ACHA women's select team ===
As a precursor to World University Games participation, the ACHA assembled a women's select team that toured Geneva, Switzerland, Chamonix, France and Méribel, France during April 2010. The team included Rhode Island players Jolene Rambone (who served as captain), Justine Ducie, Danika Korpacz and Johanna Leskinen and was led by Rams head coach Beth McCann. Its final record overseas was 2–2–0, including two close losses to the France women's national ice hockey team and two decisive wins over local club teams.

== Rivalries ==
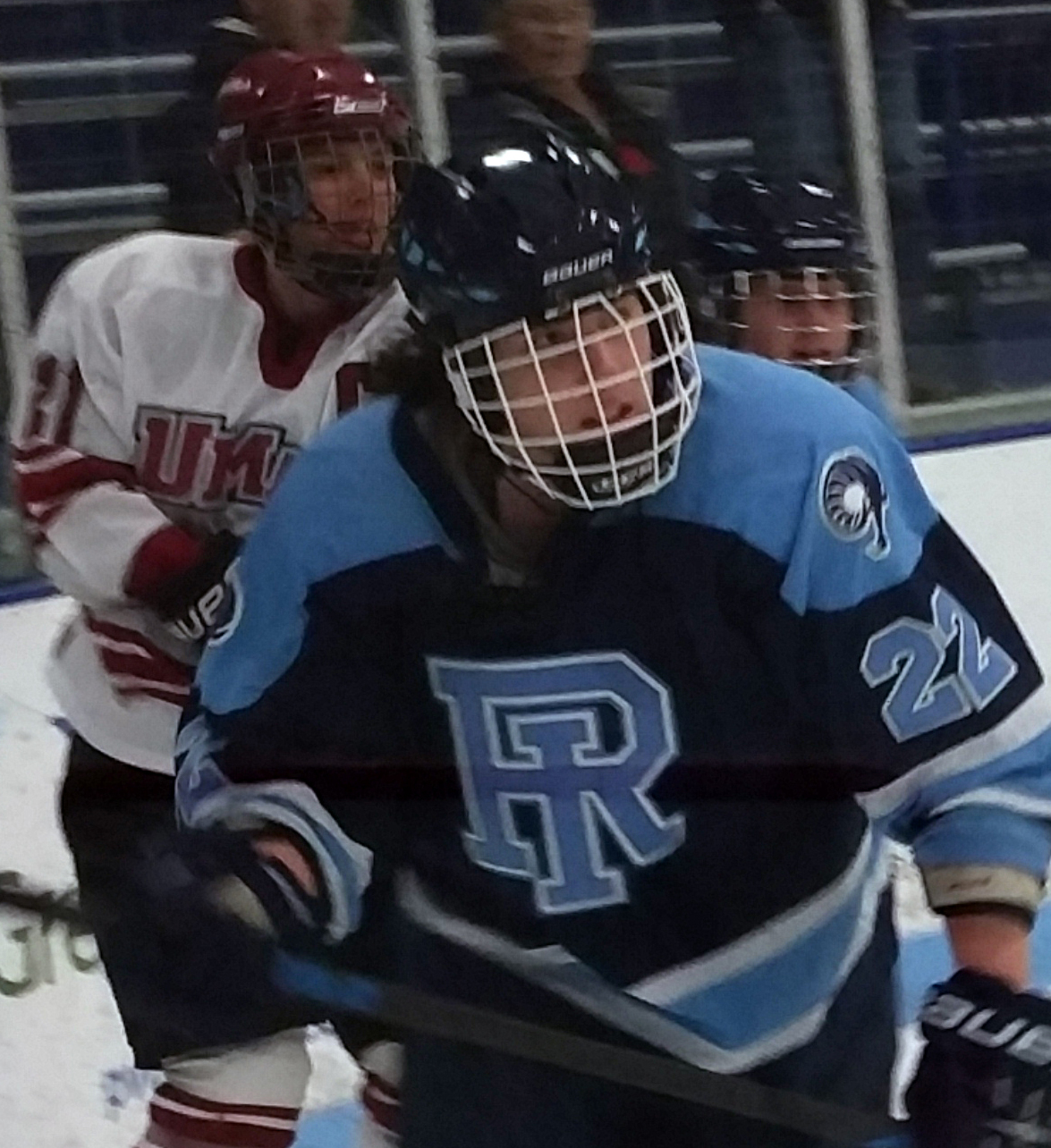
Kristy Kennedy in action against UMass during the 2015 ECWHL championship game

=== Massachusetts ===
By any measure, Rhode Island-Massachusetts is one of the nation's best rivalries, mirroring the well-regarded clashes between the universities separated by roughly a two-hour drive in men's basketball and other sports. Both are long-standing members of the ACHA's ruling class and are far and away the top two programs in the northeast, as evidenced by the fact that both rank among the top four nationally in number of ACHA National Tournament appearances. Naturally, the ECWHL title tends to be decided by URI-UMass meetings - the teams have combined to win all but one of the conference's playoff championships and all but two of its regular season crowns in 14 seasons of league play. The two have directly collided in the conference championship game at least nine times (the 2010 playoffs are undocumented), with the Rams holding a 6–3 advantage in those meetings (although the Minutewomen have won the last three, in 2015, 2016 and 2017, most recently by a 3–0 count). The 2008 final was particularly notable. In that contest, Rhode Island stormed out to a 3–0 lead after the first period, only to see Massachusetts reply with four unanswered to take the lead in the third period. However, the Rams' Rachel MacDonald forced overtime with 3:25 remaining, allowing URI's Justine Ducie to win the trophy in the sixth minute of the third extra period. Both URI (12 times) and UMass (13 times) have qualified for the ACHA championships very frequently in their 14 years of conference membership, so ECWHL playoff failures have generally not proven fatal - or final. The teams have met five times at the ACHA National Tournament, with the Rams holding a 3–1–1 head-to-head edge. Each side has knocked the other from the tournament once, with a 1–0 Rhode Island win in the 2007 quarterfinals answered by a 2–1 result for the Minutewomen in the 2014 semifinals. During the 2016 tournament, with both teams already eliminated in the pool stage, URI gained a measure of revenge for UMass' victory in the ECWHL title game three weeks earlier with a 5–2 win behind two goals each from Alisha DiFilippo and Monica Darby.

One other significant event in the rivalry's history took place in 2007, when Cara Murphy transferred from URI to UMass. Murphy had been a second-team All-American twice with the Rams, while leading the team in scoring during the 2006–07 season, and finished her career in the Bay Staters' colors with another pair of All-American seasons.

=== Penn State ===
Perhaps no series has reflected URI's status quite like the one with Penn State. Penn State's original women's hockey team was a powerhouse in the early days of ACHA sanctioning, and accordingly drummed the then-building Rams by a combined 50–2 count over four games during the 2000–01 and 2001–02 seasons. However, the fortunes of both teams drastically reversed once each became a charter member of the ECWHL in 2003–04. Rhode Island thoroughly dominated the series from there, starting with a 28-game unbeaten run lasting from November 15, 2003, until October 23, 2010 and finishing 34–2–1 against the Lady Icers from 2003–04 through 2011–12 (including 4–0–0 in the ECWHL playoffs and a 5–0 result at the 2010 ACHA National Tournament). PSU transitioned its team to NCAA Division I for the 2012–13 season, but the university also formed a new ACHA program that year, which eventually joined ACHA Division 1 and the ECWHL in 2014–15. URI has gone 12–1–0 against the second team, called the Lady Ice Lions, including ECWHL playoff semifinal wins in 2015, 2016 and 2017. The rivalry received a bit of added spice when, on the heels of that 2015 semifinal win and despite the Rams taking two of the three meetings during 2014–15, Penn State received the final bid to the ACHA National Tournament ahead of URI.

=== Robert Morris (IL) ===
Despite the series being played infrequently with the teams in separate conferences and geographic regions, Robert Morris (IL) represented something of a bogey team for Rhode Island during some of the best seasons for both programs. RMU appeared in five straight ACHA national championship games from 2005 through 2009, winning the 2005 and 2007 titles. That stretch, of course, significantly overlaps with URI's five ACHA semifinals appearances in a row from 2004 through 2008. The resulting clashes of the titans generally went the Eagles' way, as they knocked the Rams from that semifinal round in 2005, 2006 and 2008. Overall, Rhode Island is 0–6–0 against RMU in ACHA tournament play, with the most recent contest taking place in 2012, when the Eagles once again blocked Beth McCann's squad from advancement with a 2–0 win in the final game of the pool round. The most recent meeting between the sides occurred during the 2014–15 regular season, with a Cassie Catlow hat trick powering a 6–4 URI win before RMU forfeited the second game of the series.

=== Sacred Heart ===
Although games between the Rams and Sacred Heart, an NCAA Division I program, count for little more than bragging rights, SHU is a staple of Rhode Island's schedule each season and a valuable measuring-stick opponent. The teams have met at least twice every year since 2003–04, with the Pioneers holding a decisive 37–3–0 series edge. Rhode Island's most recent win used a DiFilippo hat trick and 45 Abigail Torres saves to upend homestanding SHU by a 3–2 score on November 21, 2015.

== Players ==
=== Current roster ===
As of October 18, 2017.

No.	Nat.	Player	Class	Pos	Height	DoB	Hometown	Previous team
2		Tai Marino	Junior	F	5' 0" (1.52 m)	1997-07-02	South Kingstown, Rhode Island	South County High School (USHS–RI)
3		Michelle Monet	Senior	D	5' 4" (1.63 m)	1996-03-28	Pembroke, Massachusetts	Archbishop Williams High School (USHS–MA)
4		Shaylyn Maybury	Junior	D	5' 4" (1.63 m)	1997-01-10	Jacksonville, Florida	Boston Bandits (USAH Massachusetts)
5		Caitlin McGuirl	Junior	F	5' 9" (1.75 m)	1997-02-09	Wakefield, Rhode Island	South County High School (USHS–RI)
6		Emma Gerike	Freshman	D	5' 7" (1.7 m)		Bordentown, New Jersey	Princeton Tiger Lilies (USAH Atlantic)
7		Casey McCormick	Senior	F	5' 4" (1.63 m)	1995-08-21	Warwick, Rhode Island	Pilgrim High School (USHS–RI)
9		Brynne Costa	Sophomore	F	5' 5" (1.65 m)	1998-08-07	Rumford, Rhode Island	East Providence High School (USHS–RI)
10		Tea Williams	Sophomore	D	5' 5" (1.65 m)	1997-10-25	Narragansett, Rhode Island	South County High School (USHS–RI)
11		Jill Gonsalves	Freshman	F	5' 5" (1.65 m)		South Kingstown, Rhode Island	South County High School (USHS–RI)
12		Madison Balutowski	Sophomore	F	5' 2" (1.57 m)	1998-03-15	Warwick, Rhode Island	Warwick High School (USHS–RI)
13		Anita Mayfield-Sheehan	Freshman	F	5' 4" (1.63 m)		Brookline, Massachusetts	Brookline High School (USHS–MA)
14		Monica Darby	Senior	F	5' 5" (1.65 m)	1996-08-29	Vernon, Connecticut	East Catholic High School (USHS–CT)
15		Jillian Holden	Senior	D	5' 8" (1.73 m)	1996-08-30	Dover, New Hampshire	St. Thomas Aquinas High School (USHS–NH)
16		Leah Hoder	Junior	F	5' 4" (1.63 m)	1997-11-01	Barrington, Rhode Island	Barrington High School (USHS–RI)
17		Samantha Evans	Junior	F	5' 4" (1.63 m)	1997-03-16	Parlin, New Jersey	New Jersey Rockets (USAH Atlantic)
20		Lexie Stefekos	Senior	F	5' 7" (1.7 m)	1995-11-20	Bedford, New Hampshire	New Hampshire Avalanche (USAH New England)
23		Christina O'Neil	Sophomore	F	5' 4" (1.63 m)	1998-06-23	Sandwich, Massachusetts	Sandwich High School (USHS–MA)
30		Abigail Torres	Junior	G	5' 0" (1.52 m)	1996-12-17	Cranston, Rhode Island	East Coast Wizards (USAH Massachusetts)
33		Elizabeth Bell	Sophomore	G	5' 11" (1.8 m)	1998-01-13	Quincy, Massachusetts	Notre Dame Academy (USHS–MA)

=== Notable alumni ===
- Lynn Pecci - Assistant Coach at Salve Regina University
- Kristen Levesque - Forward for the Boston Blades in 2016–17, selected in the 2016 CWHL Draft by the team
- Sydney Collins - Selection in the 2016 CWHL Draft by the Boston Blades

== Media ==
- WRIU - Rhode Island's college radio station occasionally covers Rams home games, either on its primary station broadcasting at 90.3 FM or on its internet-only overflow station, called RIU2. On the occasions when the Rams host the ECWHL playoffs (the playoffs are hosted by the previous season's champion), WRIU also publishes a blog including photos and recaps of each game.
- The Good 5 Cent Cigar - URI's student paper includes a women's hockey beat reporter on staff and runs frequent articles about the team.

== See also ==
- American Collegiate Hockey Association
- Eastern Collegiate Women's Hockey League
- Rhode Island Rams men's ice hockey
- Bradford R. Boss Arena
- University of Rhode Island
