= Mullins Center =

Building in Massachusetts, United States

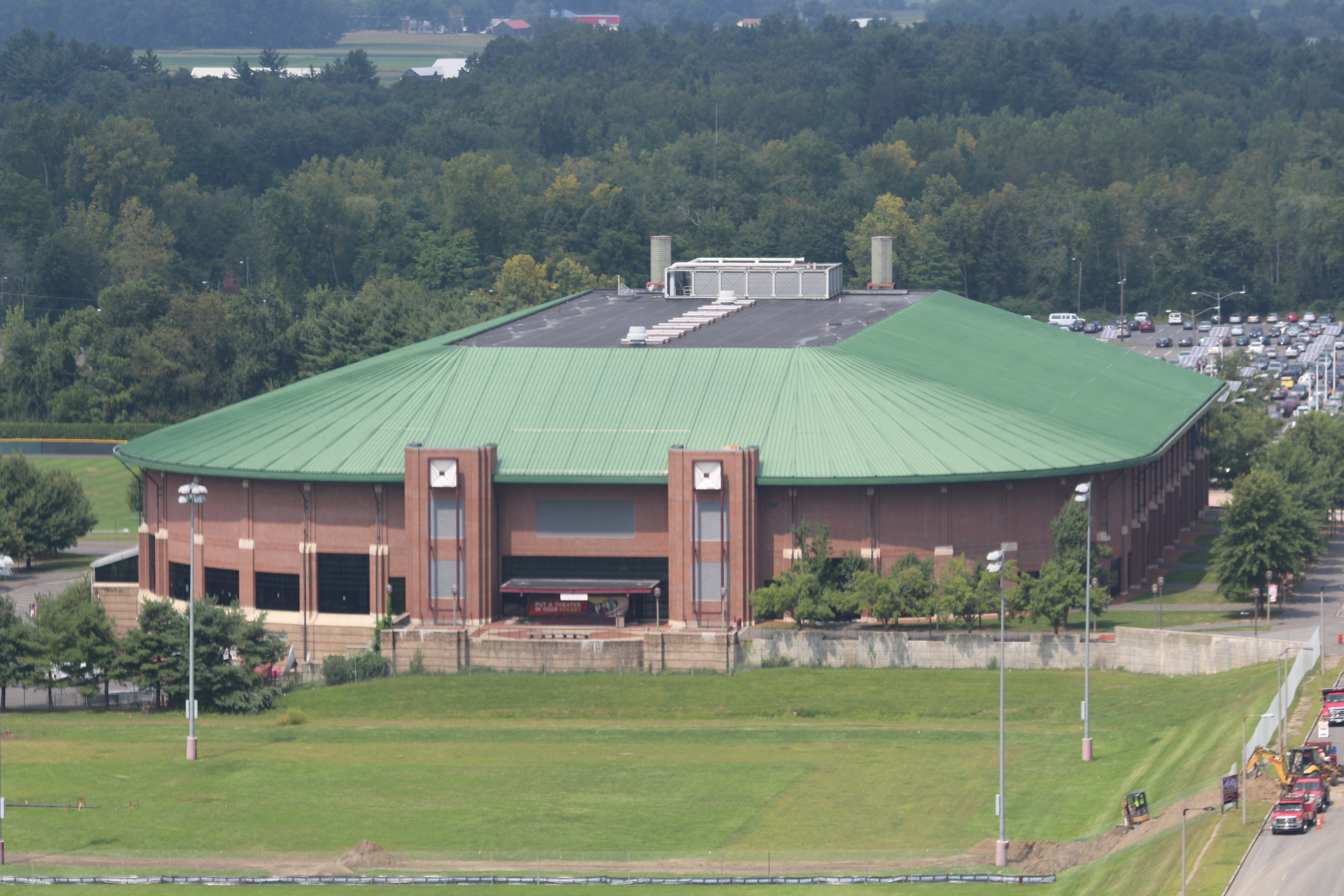
- Mullins Center in 2013

- Location in Massachusetts Location in the United States
- Location: 200 Commonwealth Avenue; Amherst, Massachusetts 01003
- Coordinates: 42°23′21.77″N 72°32′0.38″W
- Owner: University of Massachusetts Amherst
- Operator: Global Spectrum
- Capacity: 9,493 (basketball); 8,387 (hockey)
- Surface: 200 × 95 ft (hockey)

Construction
- Groundbreaking: January 1991
- Opened: February 4, 1993
- Cost: $51 million ($114 million in 2025 dollars)
- Architect: Cambridge Seven Associates, Inc.
- Structural engineers: Lim Consultants, Inc.
- General contractor: Suffolk Construction Company

Tenants
- UMass Minutemen basketball (men's and women's); UMass Men's ice hockey

The William D. Mullins Memorial Center, also known as the Mullins Center, is a 9,493-seat multi-purpose arena (10,500 for 360 concerts), located on the campus of the University of Massachusetts, in Amherst, Massachusetts. The Mullins Center is the home of UMass Minutemen men's basketball, women's basketball, and men's ice hockey. In addition, the venue hosts numerous concerts, family shows, theater shows, and commencements annually. Located adjacent to the Mullins Center is the Mullins Community Ice Rink, which is open for public skating and racquetball, while also serving as the home rink for the UMass women's ice hockey team.

In 1985, William D. Mullins, a state representative from Ludlow, suggested that the university needed a multipurpose arena and convocation center to help expand the athletic program and assist in the university's growth. He died in 1986, but the state went ahead with the building of the complex, naming it for him. It replaced the Curry Hicks Cage, the 1930s-era basketball gymnasium, as home of the Minutemen basketball teams. In addition, it allowed the hockey team, which had been downgraded to club status since the late 1970s, to be elevated to Division I status.

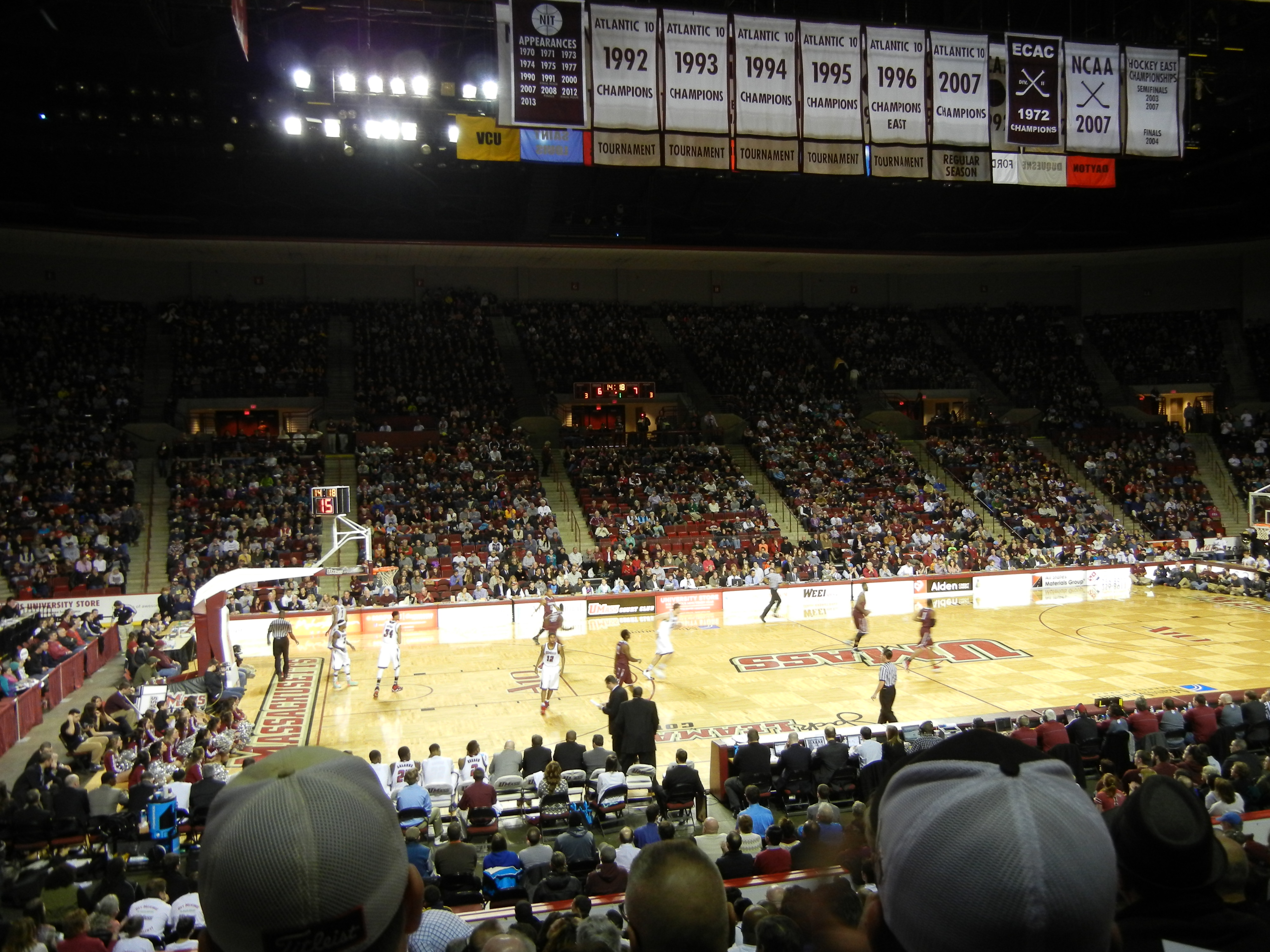
Mullins Center interior

The Mullins Center is managed by Spectra, which manages over 70 different event arenas throughout the United States.

== Concerts and events ==
The Mullins Center has hosted many performances over the years, including:

=== Musical ===
Metallica

- February 15, 1993

Aerosmith

- September 21, 1993

Elton John

- October 22, 1993
- November 5, 1997
- April 8, 2000
- April 17, 2004

Phish

- April 16, 1994
- November 3, 1994
- December 4, 1995
- December 5, 1995
- October 23, 2010
- October 24, 2010

Pansy Division

- November 28, 1994

Green Day

- November 28, 1994
- April 30, 2005

Indigo Girls

- December 9, 1994

K's Choice

- December 9, 1994

Live

- March 11, 1995
- November 13, 1997

Barry Manilow

- October 21, 1995

Alanis Morissette

- February 4, 1996
- February 11, 1999

311

- September 13, 1996
- November 24, 1997
- November 19, 2005

Dave Matthews Band

- October 6, 1996
- May 5, 2003
- April 21, 2007

The Black Crows

- November 3, 1996

Smashing Pumpkins

- January 28, 1997

Fountains of Wayne

- January 28, 1997

Stone Temple Pilots

- April 26, 1997

Cheap Trick

- April 26, 1997

Ani DiFranco

- April 4, 1998
- April 9, 1999
- October 28, 2000
- November 15, 2003

Matchbox 20

- April 7, 1998
- September 22, 2000

Korn

- November 6, 1998

Incubus

- November 6, 1998
- May 14, 2002

Tori Amos

- November 15, 1998

Soul Coughing

- November 13, 1998

Bob Dylan

- February 24, 1999
- November 18, 1999
- November 20, 2004
- November 15, 2006
- November 19, 2010

The Mighty Mighty Bosstones

- May 8, 1999

The Goo Goo Dolls

- October 20, 1999

Luscious Jackson

- February 28, 2000

Foo Fighters

- April 2, 2000

Muse

- April 2, 2000

Red Hot Chili Peppers

- April 2, 2000
- September 9, 2003

Creed

- April 15, 2000

Sevendust

- April 15, 2000

U.P.O

- April 15, 2000

The Jayhawks

- September 22, 2000

Barenaked Ladies

- February 16, 2001
- October 24, 2006

String Cheese Incident

- October 26, 2001

Widespread Panic

- November 9, 2001

Udo Lindenberg

- April 26, 2002

Counting Crows

- October 5, 2002

Tool

- October 25, 2002

John Mayer

- November 23, 2002
- February 26, 2006
- February 26, 2007

Queens of the Stone Age

- September 9, 2003

French Toast

- September 9, 2003

Delirious?

- September 27, 2003

Good Charlotte

- October 10, 2003

Blake Shelton

- February 12, 2004
- February 11, 2006

Neil Young

- March 21, 2004

Pixies

- November 30, 2004

My Chemical Romance

- April 30, 2005

Dropkick Murphys

- May 1, 2005

Velvet Revolver

- May 3, 2005

Alison Krauss

- May 19, 2005

Tim McGraw

- September 15, 2005

Kanye West

- October 31, 2005

Keith Urban

- November 11, 2005

Nine Inch Nails

- March 10, 2006

Black Eyed Peas

- April 25, 2006

The Roots

- May 7, 2006

The All-American Rejects

- October 21, 2006

Mike Doughty

- October 24, 2006

The Raconteurs

- November 15, 2006

Disturbed

- November 19, 2006

Flyleaf

- November 19, 2006

Nonpoint

- November 19, 2006

Stone Sour

- November 19, 2006

Amour for Sleep

- April 5, 2007

Underoath

- April 5, 2007

O.A.R

- April 14, 2007
- November 18, 2008

Tim Reynolds

- April 21, 2007

OK Go

- May 6, 2007

Ben Folds

- May 6, 2007

The Suburbs

- May 6, 2007

Gym Class Heroes

- September 19, 2007

Sick Puppies

- December 7, 2007

Evanescence

- December 7, 2007

Julien-K

- December 7, 2007

Carrie Underwood

- February 20, 2008
- March 27, 2010

Casting Crowns

- February 29, 2008

Jimmy Eat World

- May 4, 2008

Willie Nelson

- April 17, 2009

Lupe Fiasco

- May 3, 2009

N.E.R.D

- October 25, 2009

J. Cole

- October 25, 2009
- April 15, 2012

Jay-Z

- October 25, 2009

Further

- February 19, 2010
- November 6, 2011

Craig Morgan

- March 27, 2010

New Found Glory

- April 25, 2010

Ludacris

- April 25, 2010

LMFAO

- April 25, 2010

Electrolightz

- April 25, 2010

Samuel Adams

- April 30, 2010

Daughtry

- June 14, 2010

Mike Posner

- September 25, 2010

Far East Movement

- September 25, 2010

Stephen Jerzak

- September 25, 2010

2AM Club

- September 25, 2010

Bad Rabbits

- September 25, 2010

XV

- September 25, 2010

Newsboys

- October 8, 2010

Jimmy Needham

- October 9, 2010

Wiz Khalifa

- November 20, 2010

Big K.R.I.T

- November 20, 2010
- April 15, 2012

Donnis

- November 20, 2010

DJ Khaled

- January 28, 2011

Escape Reality

- April 1, 2011
- April 2, 2011

B.o.B

- April 17, 2011

3OH!3

- April 17, 2011

Pretty Lights

- April 17, 2011

Kids on the Hill

- April 17, 2011

Jason Aldean

- April 29, 2011

Eric Church

- April 29, 2011

The JaneDean Girls

- April 29, 2011

Tiesto

- September 19, 2011

Acquire the Fire

- October 1, 2011

Thousand Foot Krutch

- October 1, 2011

Deadmau5

- October 15, 2011

Feed Me

- October 15, 2011

Tommy Lee

- October 15, 2011

Afrojack

- October 25, 2011

Phil Lesh

- November 6, 2011

Further

- November 6, 2011

Bob Weir

- November 6, 2011

3 Doors Down

- November 10, 2011

Theory of a Deadman

- November 10, 2011

Pop Evil

- November 10, 2011

Lady Antebellum

- December 15, 2011

Josh Kelley

- December 15, 2011

Edens Edge

- December 15, 2011

Avicii

- January 31, 2012
- April 19, 2012

Rusko

- February 10, 2012

Miranda Lambert

- February 16, 2012

Chris Young

- February 16, 2012

Jerrod Niemann

- February 16, 2012

Third Blind Eye

- April 15, 2012

Fantazia

- April 28, 2012

=== Family events ===
Care Bears Live
"Caring & Sharing Friends"

- December 15–18, 2005

Barney the Dinosaur

- February 16, 2006

Doodlebops

- October 7, 2006

Walking with Dinosaurs

- March 27–30, 2008

Cirque du Soleil
Saltimbanco

- September 3–7, 2008

Playhouse Disney Live!

- November 1, 2008

Sesame Street Live!

Cirque du Soleil
Alegría

- September 16–20, 2009

Disney's Phineas and Ferb

- September 10, 2011

Cirque du Soleil
"Quidam"

- October 9, 2011

Michael Jackson The Immortal World Tour By Cirque Du Soleil

- March 6, 2014

=== Entertainers, miscellaneous events ===
Jim Breuer

- October 9, 2004
- February 1, 2008

David Copperfield

- February 6, 2006

Stars on Ice

Boston Pops

Bill Cosby

- October 29, 2004

WWE

Full Throttle Energy Drink's Pro Wrestling Live!

Dayglow

Daniel Tosh

- October 27, 2010

Lipizzaner Stallions

Russell Brand

- November 19, 2011

=== Sports ===
Boston Bruins

- Exhibition Game

USA vs. Russia

NCAA Women's Volleyball Championship

- 1995

Boston Celtics

- Exhibition Game

== See also ==
- List of NCAA Division I basketball arenas
