= Bradford R. Boss Arena =

Ice arena in Kingston, Rhode Island

Coordinates: 41.483907°N 71.538196°W

- Brad Boss Arena

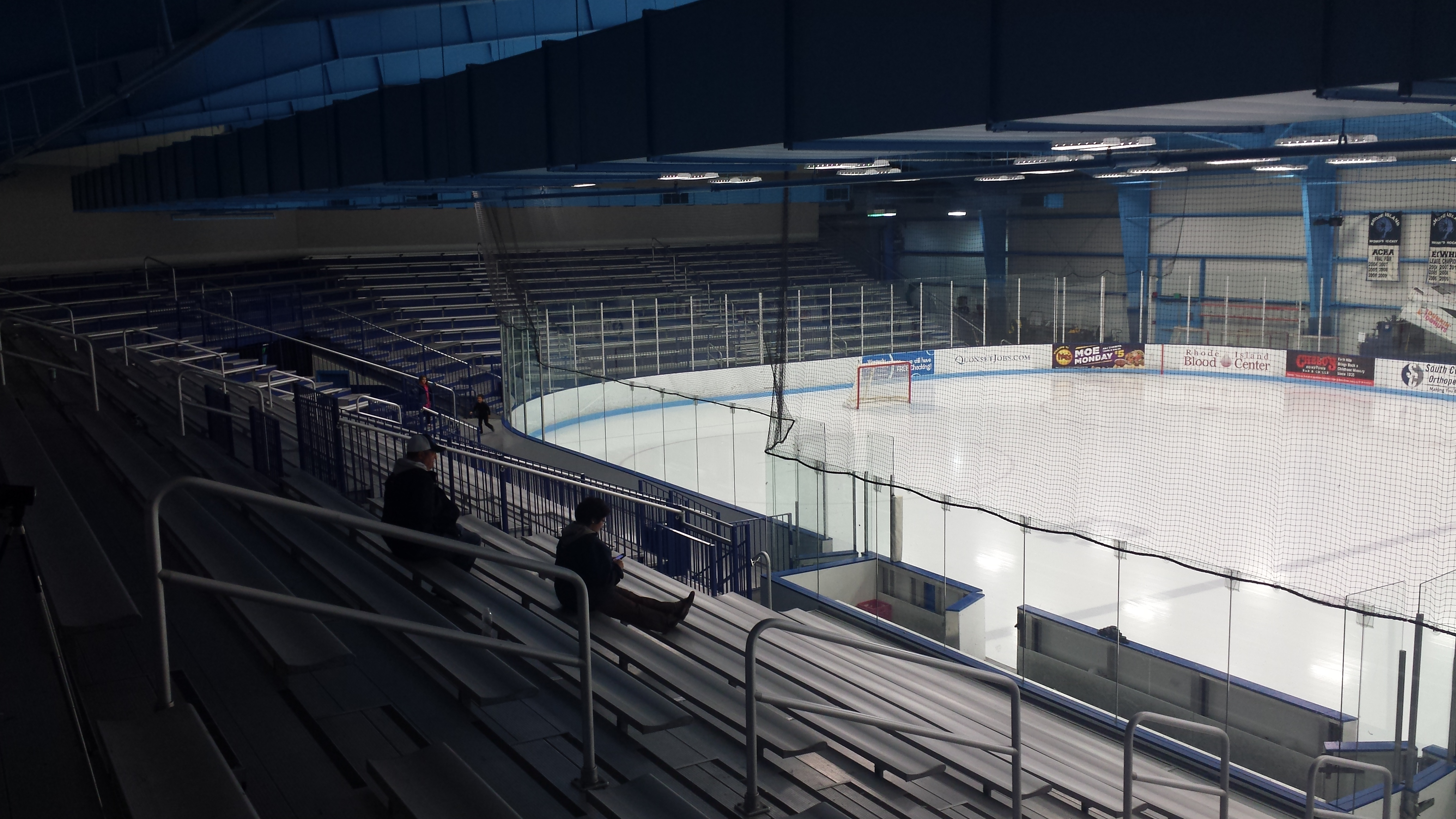
- Interactive map of Bradford R. Boss Arena
- Location: Kingston, Rhode Island
- Owner: University of Rhode Island
- Operator: Global Spectrum
- Capacity: 2,500 (hockey)
- Surface: 200' x 85'

Construction
- Groundbreaking: August 9, 2001
- Opened: September 15, 2002
- Cost: $12 million
- Architects: Symmes Maini & McKee Associates
- Project managers: Brailsford & Dunlavey; Gilbane Building Company

Tenants
- University of Rhode Island Rams (ice hockey); Rhode Island Kingfish (Lacrosse)

The Bradford R. Boss Arena is a 2,500-seat ice arena on the campus of The University of Rhode Island located in Kingston, Rhode Island. The ice arena is named in honor of Bradford R. Boss, one of the founders of the URI men's hockey club in 1951, member of the URI class of 1955, and member of URI Athletic Hall of Fame.

The facility is home to the Rhode Island Rams men's and women's ice hockey teams. The men's competes at the ACHA Division I level in the Eastern States Collegiate Hockey League; while the women's team competes at ACHA Women's Division I level in the Eastern Collegiate Women's Hockey League. It is also used for local high school ice hockey, local youth hockey and figure skating clubs and organizations, public ice skating, and for intramural sports.
