= 1962–63 NCAA University Division men's basketball season =

Men's collegiate basketball season

- Preseason AP No. 1: Cincinnati Bearcats
- NCAA Tournament: 1963
- Tournament dates: March 9 – 23, 1963
- National Championship: Freedom Hall; Louisville, Kentucky
- NCAA Champions: Loyola Ramblers
- Helms National Champions: Loyola Ramblers
- Other champions: Providence Friars (NIT)
- Player of the Year (Helms): Art Heyman, Duke Blue Devils

The 1962–63 NCAA University Division men's basketball season began in December 1962, progressed through the regular season and conference tournaments, and concluded with the 1963 NCAA University Division basketball tournament championship game on March 23, 1963, at Freedom Hall in Louisville, Kentucky. The Loyola University Chicago Ramblers won their first NCAA national championship with a 60–58 victory in overtime over the Cincinnati Bearcats.

== Season headlines ==
- The Western Athletic Conference began play, with six charter members.
- While playing Wyoming in the All-City Tournament in Oklahoma City, Oklahoma, on December 28, 1962, Loyola of Illinois replaced starter John Egan with Pablo Robertson during the second half, becoming the first team ever to have five African American players on the floor at the same time.
- Terry Baker of Oregon State became the first college football Heisman Trophy winner to play in the NCAA tournament's Final Four.
- The Metropolitan New York Conference disbanded at the end of the season after 24 seasons of competition.

== Season outlook ==
=== Pre-season polls ===
The Top 10 from the AP Poll and the Top 20 from the UPI Coaches Poll during the pre-season.

Associated Press
Ranking	Team
1	Cincinnati
2	Duke
3	Kentucky
4	Loyola (Ill.)
5	West Virginia
6	Mississippi State
7	Oregon State
8	Illinois
9	St. Bonaventure
10	Wisconsin

UPI Coaches
Ranking	Team
1	Cincinnati
2	Duke
3	Kentucky
4	West Virginia
5	Loyola (Ill.)
6	Oregon State
7	Mississippi State
8	St. Bonaventure
9	Wisconsin
10 (tie)	Bowling Green
10 (tie)	Stanford
12	Dayton
13	Illinois
14	Kansas State
15	Arizona State
16	NYU
17	UCLA
18	Colorado State
19	Creighton
20	Indiana

== Conference membership changes ==
School	Former conference	New conference
Arizona Wildcats	Border Conference	Western Athletic Conference
Arizona State Sun Devils	Border Conference	Western Athletic Conference
BYU Cougars	Mountain States (Skyline) Conference	Western Athletic Conference
Colorado State Rams	Mountain States (Skyline) Conference	NCAA University Division independent
Denver Pioneers	Mountain States (Skyline) Conference	NCAA University Division independent
Hardin–Simmons Cowboys	Border Conference	NCAA University Division independent
Montana Grizzlies	Mountain States (Skyline) Conference	NCAA University Division independent
New Mexico Lobos	Mountain States (Skyline) Conference	Western Athletic Conference
New Mexico State Aggies	Border Conference	NCAA University Division independent
Rutgers Scarlet Knights	Middle Atlantic Conference	NCAA University Division independent
Texas Western Miners	Border Conference	NCAA University Division independent
Utah Utes	Mountain States (Skyline) Conference	Western Athletic Conference
Utah State Aggies	Mountain States (Skyline) Conference	NCAA University Division independent
West Texas State Buffaloes	Border Conference	NCAA University Division independent
Wyoming Cowboys	Mountain States (Skyline) Conference	Western Athletic Conference

== Regular season ==
=== Conferences ===
==== Conference winners and tournaments ====
Conference	Regular season winner	Conference player of the year	Conference tournament	Tournament venue (City)	Tournament winner
Athletic Association of Western Universities	Stanford & UCLA	None selected	No Tournament		
Atlantic Coast Conference	Duke	Art Heyman, Duke	1963 ACC men's basketball tournament	Reynolds Coliseum (Raleigh, North Carolina)	Duke
Big Eight Conference	Colorado & Kansas State	None selected	No Tournament		
Big Ten Conference	Illinois & Ohio State	None selected	No Tournament		
Ivy League	Princeton	None selected	No Tournament		
Metropolitan New York Conference	Fordham		No Tournament		
Mid-American Conference	Bowling Green State	None selected	No Tournament		
Middle Atlantic Conference	Saint Joseph's		No Tournament		
Missouri Valley Conference	Cincinnati	None selected	No Tournament		
Ohio Valley Conference	Morehead State & Tennessee Tech	Harold Sergent, Morehead State	No Tournament		
Southeastern Conference	Mississippi State	None selected	No Tournament		
Southern Conference	West Virginia	Fred Hetzel, Davidson	1963 Southern Conference men's basketball tournament	Richmond Arena (Richmond, Virginia)	West Virginia
Southwest Conference	Texas	Bennie Lenox, Texas A&M	No Tournament		
West Coast Athletic Conference	San Francisco	Steve Gray, Saint Mary's	No Tournament		
Western Athletic Conference	Arizona State	None selected	No Tournament		
Yankee Conference	Connecticut	None selected	No Tournament		

==== Conference standings ====
1962–63 AAWU Conference men's basketball standings
	Conf.				Overall
Team	W		L	PCT	W		L	PCT
UCLA †	7	–	5	.583	20	–	9	.690
Stanford	7	–	5	.583	16	–	9	.640
USC	6	–	6	.500	20	–	9	.690
Washington	6	–	6	.500	13	–	13	.500
California	4	–	8	.333	13	–	11	.542
† Conference playoff game winner Rankings from AP Poll

1962–63 ACC men's basketball standings
	Conf.				Overall
Team	W		L	PCT	W		L	PCT
No. 2 Duke †	14	–	0	1.000	27	–	3	.900
Wake Forest	11	–	3	.786	16	–	10	.615
North Carolina	10	–	4	.714	15	–	6	.714
Clemson	5	–	9	.357	12	–	13	.480
NC State	5	–	9	.357	10	–	11	.476
South Carolina	4	–	10	.286	9	–	15	.375
Maryland	4	–	10	.286	8	–	13	.381
Virginia	3	–	11	.214	5	–	20	.200
† 1963 ACC tournament winner Rankings from AP Poll

1962–63 Big Eight Conference men's basketball standings
	Conf.				Overall
Team	W		L	PCT	W		L	PCT
No. 10 Colorado	11	–	3	.786	19	–	7	.731
Kansas State	11	–	3	.786	16	–	9	.640
Iowa State	8	–	6	.571	14	–	11	.560
Oklahoma	8	–	6	.571	12	–	13	.480
Oklahoma State	7	–	7	.500	16	–	9	.640
Kansas	5	–	9	.357	12	–	13	.480
Missouri	5	–	9	.357	10	–	15	.400
Nebraska	1	–	13	.071	6	–	19	.240
Rankings from AP Poll

1962–63 Big Ten Conference men's basketball standings
	Conf.				Overall
Team	W		L	PCT	W		L	PCT
No. 7 Ohio State	11	–	3	.786	20	–	4	.833
No. 8 Illinois	11	–	3	.786	20	–	6	.769
Indiana	9	–	5	.643	13	–	11	.542
Michigan	8	–	6	.571	16	–	8	.667
Minnesota	8	–	6	.571	12	–	12	.500
Wisconsin	7	–	7	.500	14	–	10	.583
Northwestern	6	–	8	.429	9	–	15	.375
Iowa	5	–	9	.357	9	–	15	.375
Michigan State	3	–	11	.214	4	–	16	.200
Purdue	2	–	12	.143	7	–	17	.292
Rankings from AP Poll

1962–63 Ivy League men's basketball standings
	Conf.				Overall
Team	W		L	PCT	W		L	PCT
Princeton†	11	–	3	.786	19	–	6	.760
Yale	11	–	3	.786	13	–	10	.565
Pennsylvania	10	–	4	.714	19	–	6	.760
Brown	6	–	8	.429	11	–	13	.458
Cornell	6	–	7	.462	12	–	12	.500
Harvard	5	–	9	.357	6	–	15	.286
Columbia	4	–	9	.308	10	–	12	.455
Dartmouth	2	–	12	.143	7	–	18	.280
† Regular-season championship winner Rankings from AP Poll

1962–63 Metropolitan New York Conference men's basketball standings
	Conf.				Overall
Team	W		L	PCT	W		L	PCT
Fordham	4	–	1	.800	18	–	8	.692
No. 9 NYU	3	–	1	.750	18	–	5	.783
St. Francis (NY)	4	–	2	.667	16	–	7	.696
St. John's	2	–	2	.500	9	–	15	.375
CCNY	1	–	2	.333	8	–	10	.444
Brooklyn	0	–	2	.000	6	–	12	.333
Manhattan	0	–	4	.000	9	–	14	.391
Rankings from AP Poll

1962–63 Mid-American Conference men's basketball standings
	Conf.				Overall
Team	W		L	PCT	W		L	PCT
Bowling Green State	9	–	3	.750	19	–	8	.704
Ohio	8	–	4	.667	13	–	11	.542
Toledo	8	–	4	.667	13	–	11	.542
Miami (Ohio)	8	–	4	.667	12	–	12	.500
Western Michigan	7	–	5	.583	12	–	12	.500
Marshall	1	–	11	.083	7	–	16	.304
Kent State	1	–	11	.083	3	–	18	.143
Rankings from AP Poll

1962–63 MAC men's basketball standings
	Conf.				Overall
Team	W		L	PCT	W		L	PCT
Saint Joseph's†	8	–	0	1.000	23	–	5	.821
La Salle	7	–	1	.875	16	–	8	.667
Delaware	7	–	3	.700	14	–	8	.636
Temple	6	–	3	.667	15	–	7	.682
Lafayette	6	–	4	.600	13	–	11	.542
Gettysburg	6	–	5	.545	16	–	9	.640
Lehigh	3	–	10	.231	6	–	19	.240
Bucknell	2	–	8	.200	7	–	16	.304
Muhlenberg	0	–	11	.000	4	–	17	.190
† Regular-season championship winner Rankings from AP Poll

1962–63 Missouri Valley Conference men's basketball standings
	Conf.				Overall
Team	W		L	PCT	W		L	PCT
No. 1 Cincinnati	11	–	1	.917	26	–	2	.929
No. 5 Wichita Municipal	7	–	5	.583	19	–	8	.704
Bradley	6	–	6	.500	17	–	9	.654
Saint Louis	6	–	6	.500	16	–	12	.571
Tulsa	5	–	7	.417	17	–	8	.680
North Texas State	4	–	8	.333	10	–	14	.417
Drake	3	–	9	.250	11	–	14	.440
Rankings from AP Poll

1962–63 Ohio Valley Conference men's basketball standings
	Conf.				Overall
Team	W		L	PCT	W		L	PCT
Tennessee Tech	8	–	4	.667	16	–	8	.667
Morehead State	8	–	4	.667	13	–	7	.650
East Tennessee State	7	–	5	.583	14	–	8	.636
Murray State	6	–	6	.500	13	–	9	.591
Eastern Kentucky State	6	–	6	.500	9	–	12	.429
Middle Tennessee	4	–	8	.333	9	–	15	.375
Western Kentucky State	3	–	9	.250	5	–	16	.238
Rankings from AP Poll

1962–63 Southeastern Conference men's basketball standings
	Conf.				Overall
Team	W		L	PCT	W		L	PCT
No. 6 Mississippi State	12	–	2	.857	22	–	6	.786
Auburn	10	–	4	.714	18	–	4	.818
Georgia Tech	10	–	4	.714	21	–	5	.808
Vanderbilt	9	–	5	.643	16	–	7	.696
Kentucky	8	–	6	.571	16	–	9	.640
Alabama	7	–	7	.500	14	–	11	.560
Tennessee	6	–	8	.429	13	–	11	.542
LSU	5	–	9	.357	12	–	12	.500
Florida	5	–	9	.357	12	–	14	.462
Georgia	4	–	10	.286	9	–	17	.346
Ole Miss	4	–	10	.286	7	–	17	.292
Tulane	4	–	10	.286	6	–	16	.273
Rankings from AP Poll

1962–63 Southern Conference men's basketball standings
	Conf.				Overall
Team	W		L	PCT	W		L	PCT
West Virginia †	11	–	2	.846	23	–	8	.742
Davidson	8	–	3	.727	20	–	7	.741
William & Mary	10	–	5	.667	15	–	9	.625
Furman	9	–	6	.600	14	–	14	.500
George Washington	6	–	6	.500	8	–	15	.348
Virginia Tech	6	–	6	.500	12	–	12	.500
VMI	6	–	10	.375	6	–	15	.286
Richmond	3	–	13	.188	7	–	18	.280
The Citadel	2	–	10	.167	3	–	20	.130
† Southern Conference Tournament winner Rankings from AP Poll

1962–63 Southwest Conference men's basketball standings
	Conf.				Overall
Team	W		L	PCT	W		L	PCT
Texas	13	–	1	.929	20	–	7	.741
Texas A&M	9	–	5	.643	16	–	8	.667
Rice	9	–	5	.643	12	–	11	.522
Arkansas	8	–	6	.571	13	–	11	.542
SMU	6	–	8	.429	12	–	12	.500
Texas Tech	6	–	8	.429	6	–	17	.261
Baylor	4	–	10	.286	7	–	17	.292
TCU	1	–	13	.071	4	–	20	.167
Rankings from AP Poll

1962–63 West Coast Athletic Conference men's basketball standings
	Conf.				Overall
Team	W		L	PCT	W		L	PCT
San Francisco	10	–	2	.833	18	–	9	.667
Santa Clara	9	–	3	.750	16	–	9	.640
Saint Mary's	8	–	4	.667	14	–	11	.560
Pepperdine	6	–	6	.500	14	–	11	.560
San Jose State		–		–	14	–	10	.583
Loyola (Calif.)	3	–	9	.250	9	–	17	.346
Pacific	0	–	12	.000	4	–	22	.154
† Regular-season championship winner Rankings from AP Poll

1962–63 WAC men's basketball standings
	Conf.				Overall
Team	W		L	PCT	W		L	PCT
No. 4 Arizona State	9	–	1	.900	26	–	3	.897
BYU	6	–	4	.600	12	–	14	.462
Utah	5	–	5	.500	12	–	14	.462
New Mexico	4	–	6	.400	16	–	9	.640
Arizona	3	–	7	.300	13	–	13	.500
Wyoming	3	–	7	.300	11	–	15	.423
Rankings from AP Poll

1962–63 Yankee Conference men's basketball standings
	Conf.				Overall
Team	W		L	PCT	W		L	PCT
Connecticut	9	–	1	.900	18	–	7	.720
Rhode Island	8	–	2	.800	15	–	11	.577
Massachusetts	6	–	4	.600	12	–	12	.500
Maine	3	–	7	.300	8	–	15	.348
Vermont	2	–	8	.200	10	–	13	.435
New Hampshire	2	–	8	.200	7	–	17	.292

=== University Division independents ===
A total of 56 college teams played as University Division independents. Among them, Loyola of Illinois (29–2) had both the best winning percentage (.935) and the most wins.

1962–63 NCAA University Division men's basketball independents standings
	Conf.				Overall
Team	W		L	PCT	W		L	PCT
No. 3 Loyola (Ill.)		–		–	29	–	2	.935
Providence		–		–	24	–	4	.857
Miami (FL)		–		–	23	–	5	.821
Colorado State		–		–	18	–	5	.783
Seattle		–		–	21	–	6	.778
Niagara		–		–	14	–	4	.778
Idaho		–		–	20	–	6	.769
Pittsburgh		–		–	19	–	6	.760
Penn State		–		–	15	–	5	.750
Utah State		–		–	20	–	7	.741
Canisius		–		–	19	–	7	.731
Memphis		–		–	19	–	7	.731
Texas Western		–		–	19	–	7	.731
Oregon State		–		–	22	–	9	.710
Seton Hall		–		–	16	–	7	.696
Marquette		–		–	20	–	9	.690
Oklahoma City		–		–	19	–	10	.655
Villanova		–		–	19	–	10	.655
Notre Dame		–		–	17	–	9	.654
DePaul		–		–	15	–	8	.652
Holy Cross		–		–	16	–	9	.640
Iona		–		–	12	–	7	.632
Regis		–		–	15	–	9	.625
Butler		–		–	16	–	10	.615
Dayton		–		–	16	–	10	.615
Florida State		–		–	15	–	10	.600
Duquesne		–		–	13	–	9	.591
Houston		–		–	15	–	11	.577
Louisville		–		–	14	–	11	.560
Detroit		–		–	14	–	12	.538
Gonzaga		–		–	14	–	12	.538
Boston University		–		–	10	–	9	.526
St. Bonaventure		–		–	13	–	12	.520
Creighton		–		–	14	–	13	.519
Georgetown		–		–	13	–	13	.500
Montana State		–		–	13	–	13	.500
Loyola (LA)		–		–	12	–	12	.500
Navy		–		–	9	–	9	.500
Centenary		–		–	12	–	14	.462
Air Force		–		–	10	–	12	.455
Saint Francis (PA)		–		–	10	–	13	.435
Xavier		–		–	12	–	16	.429
Oregon		–		–	11	–	15	.423
Army		–		–	8	–	11	.421
Boston College		–		–	10	–	16	.385
Hardin–Simmons		–		–	10	–	16	.385
Syracuse		–		–	8	–	13	.381
Idaho State		–		–	9	–	15	.375
Portland		–		–	8	–	18	.308
Rutgers		–		–	7	–	16	.304
Colgate		–		–	5	–	13	.278
Montana		–		–	6	–	18	.250
West Texas State		–		–	6	–	18	.250
Denver		–		–	6	–	19	.240
Washington State		–		–	5	–	20	.200
New Mexico State		–		–	4	–	17	.190
Rankings from AP Poll

=== Informal championships ===
Conference	Regular season winner	Most Valuable Player
Philadelphia Big 5	Penn & Villanova	Wali Jones, Villanova, & Jim Lynam, Saint Joseph's

Penn and Villanova both finished with 3–1 records in head-to-head competition among the Philadelphia Big 5.

== Post-season tournaments ==
=== NCAA tournament ===
==== Final Four ====
National semifinals
E	Duke	75
ME	Loyola (Ill.)	94
MW	Cincinnati	80
W	Oregon State	46

National finals
ME	Loyola (Ill.)	60^{OT}
MW	Cincinnati	58
Third place
E	Duke	85
W	Oregon State	63

=== National Invitation tournament ===
==== Semifinals & finals ====
Semifinals
Villanova	46
Canisius	61
Providence	70
Marquette	64

Finals
Canisius	66
Providence	81
Third place
Villanova	58
Marquette	66

== Awards ==
=== Consensus All-American teams ===
Consensus First Team
Player	Position	Class	Team
Ron Bonham	F	Junior	Cincinnati
Jerry Harkness	G	Senior	Loyola (IL)
Art Heyman	F	Senior	Duke
Barry Kramer	G/F	Junior	NYU
Tom Thacker	G	Senior	Cincinnati

Consensus Second Team
Player	Position	Class	Team
Gary Bradds	F	Junior	Ohio State
Bill Green	F	Senior	Colorado State
Cotton Nash	F	Junior	Kentucky
Rod Thorn	G/F	Senior	West Virginia
Nate Thurmond	C	Senior	Bowling Green

=== Major player of the year awards ===
- Helms Player of the Year: Art Heyman, Duke
- Associated Press Player of the Year:Art Heyman, Duke
- UPI Player of the Year: Art Heyman, Duke
- Oscar Robertson Trophy (USBWA): Art Heyman, Duke
- Sporting News Player of the Year: Art Heyman, Duke

=== Major coach of the year awards ===
- Henry Iba Award: Ed Jucker, Cincinnati
- NABC Coach of the Year: Ed Jucker, Cincinnati
- UPI Coach of the Year: Ed Jucker, Cincinnati

=== Other major awards ===
- Robert V. Geasey Trophy (Top player in Philadelphia Big 5): Wali Jones, Villanova, & Jim Lynam, Saint Joseph's
- NIT/Haggerty Award (Top player in New York City metro area): Barry Kramer, NYU

== Coaching changes ==
A number of teams changed coaches during the season and after it ended.

Team	Former Coach	Interim Coach	New Coach	Reason
Army	George Hunter		Tates Locke	
Auburn	Joel Eaves		Bill Lynn	
Boston College	Frank Power		Bob Cousy	
Bowling Green	Harold Anderson		Warren Scholler	
Connecticut	Hugh Greer	George Wigton	Fred Shabel	Greer passed away due to a heart attacked on January 14, 1963. Assistant coach George Wigton finished the year as interim coach going 11–4.
Idaho	Joe Cipriano		Jim Goddard	Cipriano left to coach Nebraska.
Idaho State	John Evans		James Nau	
La Salle	Dudey Moore		Bob Walters	
Marshall	Jule Rivlin		Ellis T. Johnson	
Massachusetts	Matt Zunic		Johnny Orr	
Nebraska	Jerry Bush		Joe Cipriano	
Northwestern	William Rohr		Larry Glass	
Rice	John Frankie		George Carlisle	
Richmond	H. Lester Hooker		Lewis Mills	
Rutgers	Donald White		Bill Foster	
Seattle	Vince Cazzetta	Clair Markey	Bob Boyd	
Texas A&M	Bob Rogers		Shelby Metcalf	
Tulane	Clifford Wells		Ted Lenhardt	
Virginia	Billy McCann		Bill Gibson	
West Texas A&M	Metz LaFollette		Jimmy Viramontes	
Xavier	Jim McCafferty		Don Ruberg	
