= 1962–63 Michigan Wolverines men's basketball team =

American college basketball season

1962–63 Michigan Wolverines men's basketball
- Conference: Big Ten Conference
- Record: 16–8 (8–6 Big Ten)
- Head coach: Dave Strack
- Assistant coaches: James Skala; Tom Jorgensen (Freshman coach)
- MVP: Bill Buntin
- Captain: Tom Cole
- Home arena: Fielding H. Yost Field House

1962–63 Big Ten Conference men's basketball standings
	Conf.				Overall
Team	W		L	PCT	W		L	PCT
No. 7 Ohio State	11	–	3	.786	20	–	4	.833
No. 8 Illinois	11	–	3	.786	20	–	6	.769
Indiana	9	–	5	.643	13	–	11	.542
Michigan	8	–	6	.571	16	–	8	.667
Minnesota	8	–	6	.571	12	–	12	.500
Wisconsin	7	–	7	.500	14	–	10	.583
Northwestern	6	–	8	.429	9	–	15	.375
Iowa	5	–	9	.357	9	–	15	.375
Michigan State	3	–	11	.214	4	–	16	.200
Purdue	2	–	12	.143	7	–	17	.292
Rankings from AP Poll

The 1962–63 Michigan Wolverines men's basketball team represented the University of Michigan in intercollegiate college basketball during the 1962–63 season. The team played its home games at Fielding H. Yost Field House (renamed Yost Ice Arena in 1973) on the school's campus in Ann Arbor, Michigan. Under the direction of head coach Dave Strack, the team finished tied for fourth in the Big Ten Conference and failed to get an invitation to either the 1963 NCAA Men's Division I Basketball Tournament or the 1963 National Invitation Tournament. Tom Cole served as team captain, while Bill Buntin earned team MVP.

That season, the team defeated one of the three ranked opponents that it faced (#6 Illinois 84–81 on March 2, 1963, at home). The team was unranked the entire season in the Associated Press Top Ten Poll, and it also ended the season unranked in the final UPI Coaches' Poll.

During the season, Buntin led the Big Ten conference in rebounding with 15.4 per conference game. As a team, the Wolverines led the Big Ten with a 49.0 rebound per game average.

The team set the current school single-game record of 77 rebounds on February 2, 1963, against the Michigan State Spartans. It also set the single-season record of 1320, but that was broken each of the following two seasons. Buntin set the current school record (since the 1959–60 season) for consecutive point-rebound double doubles with a streak of 14 games. He also surpassed Scott Maentz's 1960 single-season total of 12 double doubles with a total of 23, which stood as a school record until Phil Hubbard posted 24 in 1977.

== Team players drafted into the NBA ==
Two players from this team were selected in the NBA draft.

Year	Round	Pick	Overall	Player	NBA Club
1965	1	Territorial	2	Bill Buntin	Detroit Pistons
1965	15	3	103	George Pomey	St. Louis Hawks
