= 1962–63 Iowa State Cyclones men's basketball team =

American college basketball season

1962–63 Iowa State Cyclones men's basketball
- Conference: Big Eight Conference
- Record: 14–11 (8–6 Big Eight)
- Head coach: Glen Anderson (4th season)
- Home arena: Iowa State Armory

1962–63 Big Eight Conference men's basketball standings
	Conf.				Overall
Team	W		L	PCT	W		L	PCT
No. 10 Colorado	11	–	3	.786	19	–	7	.731
Kansas State	11	–	3	.786	16	–	9	.640
Iowa State	8	–	6	.571	14	–	11	.560
Oklahoma	8	–	6	.571	12	–	13	.480
Oklahoma State	7	–	7	.500	16	–	9	.640
Kansas	5	–	9	.357	12	–	13	.480
Missouri	5	–	9	.357	10	–	15	.400
Nebraska	1	–	13	.071	6	–	19	.240
Rankings from AP Poll

The 1962–63 Iowa State Cyclones men's basketball team represented Iowa State University during the 1962–63 NCAA Division I men's basketball season. The Cyclones were coached by Glen Anderson, who was in his fourth season with the Cyclones. They played their home games at the Iowa State Armory in Ames, Iowa.

They finished the season 14–11, 8–6 in Big Eight play to finish tied for third place.

== Roster ==
1962–63 Iowa State Cyclones men's basketball team
Players
Coaches

Pos.	#	Name	Height	Weight	Year	Hometown
		Tom Bockholt	6 ft 3 in (1.91 m)	—
F		Vince Brewer	6 ft 3 in (1.91 m)	—	Sr
		Harry Daniels	6 ft 8 in (2.03 m)	—
F		John Davidson	6 ft 5 in (1.96 m)	—	Sr
C		Rich Froistad	6 ft 8 in (2.03 m)	—	Jr	Gladbrook, Iowa
G		Dave Groth (C)	6 ft 1 in (1.85 m)	—	Sr	Des Moines, Iowa
F		Steve Harmon	6 ft 5 in (1.96 m)	—		Chicago
F		Joe Hurst	6 ft 4 in (1.93 m)	—		Chicago
F		Gary Kleven	6 ft 5 in (1.96 m)	—	Sr
G		Tim Lowe	5 ft 10 in (1.78 m)	—	Jr	Marshalltown, Iowa
G		Don McKale	6 ft 1 in (1.85 m)	—	So	Albert City, Iowa
F		Tom Peterson	6 ft 7 in (2.01 m)	—	Jr	Story City, Iowa
G		Wilbur Sandbulte	6 ft 2 in (1.88 m)	—	So	Sioux Center, Iowa
F		Marv Straw	6 ft 4 in (1.93 m)	—	Sr
G		Bob VanderWilt	6 ft 1 in (1.85 m)	—	So	Spencer, Iowa

Head coach

- Glen Anderson

Assistant coach(es)

Legend

- (C) Team captain
- (S) Suspended
- (I) Ineligible
- (W) Walk-on
- Injured
- Current redshirt

== Schedule and results ==
Date time, TV	Rank^{#}	Opponent^{#}	Result	Record	Site city, state
Regular season
December 1, 1962*; 7:30 pm		South Dakota	W 73–56	1–0	Iowa State Armory; Ames, Iowa
December 8, 1962*; 6:35 pm		at No. 8 Indiana	W 63–55	2–0	New Fieldhouse; Bloomington, Indiana
December 10, 1962*; 8:15 pm		at Drake; Iowa Big Four	L 52–74	2–1	Veterans Memorial Auditorium; Des Moines, Iowa
December 15, 1962*; 7:35 pm		No. 10 Illinois	L 73–76 ^{OT}	2–2	Iowa State Armory; Ames, Iowa
December 17, 1962*; 7:35 pm		Toledo	W 69–51	3–2	Iowa State Armory; Ames, Iowa
December 20, 1962*; 9:00 pm		at Utah State	L 52–87	3–3	Nelson Fieldhouse; Logan, Utah
December 22, 1962*; 11:30 pm		at San Diego State; Aztec-Kiwanis Basketball Festival	W 72–59	4–3	Peterson Gymnasium; San Diego
December 26, 1962*; 9:30 pm		vs. Nebraska; Big Eight Holiday Tournament Quarterfinals	W 82–68	5–3	Municipal Auditorium; Kansas City, Missouri
December 28, 1962*; 7:30 pm		vs. Kansas; Big Eight Holiday Tournament Semifinals	L 51–69	5–4	Municipal Auditorium; Kansas City, Missouri
December 29, 1962*; 7:30 pm		vs. Oklahoma State; Big Eight Holiday Tournament Third Place	L 38–54	5–5	Municipal Auditorium; Kansas City, Missouri
January 5, 1963; 7:30 pm		at Oklahoma State	L 42–44	5–6 (0–1)	Gallagher Hall; Stillwater, Oklahoma
January 7, 1963; 8:05 pm		at Oklahoma	L 85–91	5–7 (0–2)	OU Fieldhouse; Norman, Oklahoma
January 12, 1963; 7:35 pm		Kansas	W 55–51	6–7 (1–2)	Iowa State Armory; Ames, Iowa
January 15, 1963*; 7:35 pm		Drake; Iowa Big Four	W 69–65	7–7	Iowa State Armory; Ames, Iowa
January 19, 1963; 7:30 pm		at Missouri	W 54–53 ^{OT}	8–7 (2–2)	Brewer Fieldhouse; Columbia, Missouri
January 26, 1963; 7:30 pm		Oklahoma	W 77–69	9–7 (3–2)	Iowa State Armory; Ames, Iowa
January 29, 1963; 7:30 pm		Missouri	W 78–66	10–7 (4–2)	Iowa State Armory; Ames, Iowa
February 2, 1963; 7:35 pm		at Kansas	W 69–57	11–7 (5–2)	Allen Fieldhouse; Lawrence, Kansas
February 4, 1963; 7:35 pm		Nebraska	W 83–69	12–7 (6–2)	Iowa State Armory; Ames, Iowa
February 9, 1963; 7:35 pm		Oklahoma State	L 50–54	12–8 (6–3)	Iowa State Armory; Ames, Iowa
February 11, 1963; 8:05 pm		at Nebraska	W 75–54	13–8 (7–3)	Nebraska Coliseum; Lincoln, Nebraska
February 16, 1963; 7:35 pm		No. 7 Colorado	W 73–60	14–8 (8–3)	Iowa State Armory; Ames, Iowa
February 23, 1963; 7:30 pm		at Kansas State	L 50–62	14–9 (8–4)	Ahearn Fieldhouse; Manhattan, Kansas
February 25, 1963; 9:05 pm		at Colorado	L 59–72	14–10 (8–5)	Balch Fieldhouse; Boulder, Colorado
March 4, 1963; 7:35 pm		Kansas State	L 71–78	14–11 (8–6)	Iowa State Armory; Ames, Iowa
*Non-conference game. ^{#}Rankings from AP poll. (#) Tournament seedings in parentheses. All times are in Central Time.
