= Michigan Wolverines women's ice hockey =

Sports team

- University: University of Michigan
- Conference: Central Collegiate Women's Hockey Association
- Governing Body: ACHA Women's Division 1
- Head coach: Bill Bonser (2nd season)
- Assistant coaches: Drew Maliszewski, Jonathan Yanovsky, Ethan St. Pierre, Ned Glysson (Senior Advisor)
- Arena: Yost Ice Arena; Ann Arbor, Michigan
- Colors: Maize and Blue

ACHA tournament appearances
- 2001, 2002, 2005, 2006, 2007, 2008, 2009, 2011, 2012, 2013, 2014, 2015, 2016, 2023, 2024

Conference tournament champions
- CCWHA: 2000, 2001

Current uniform
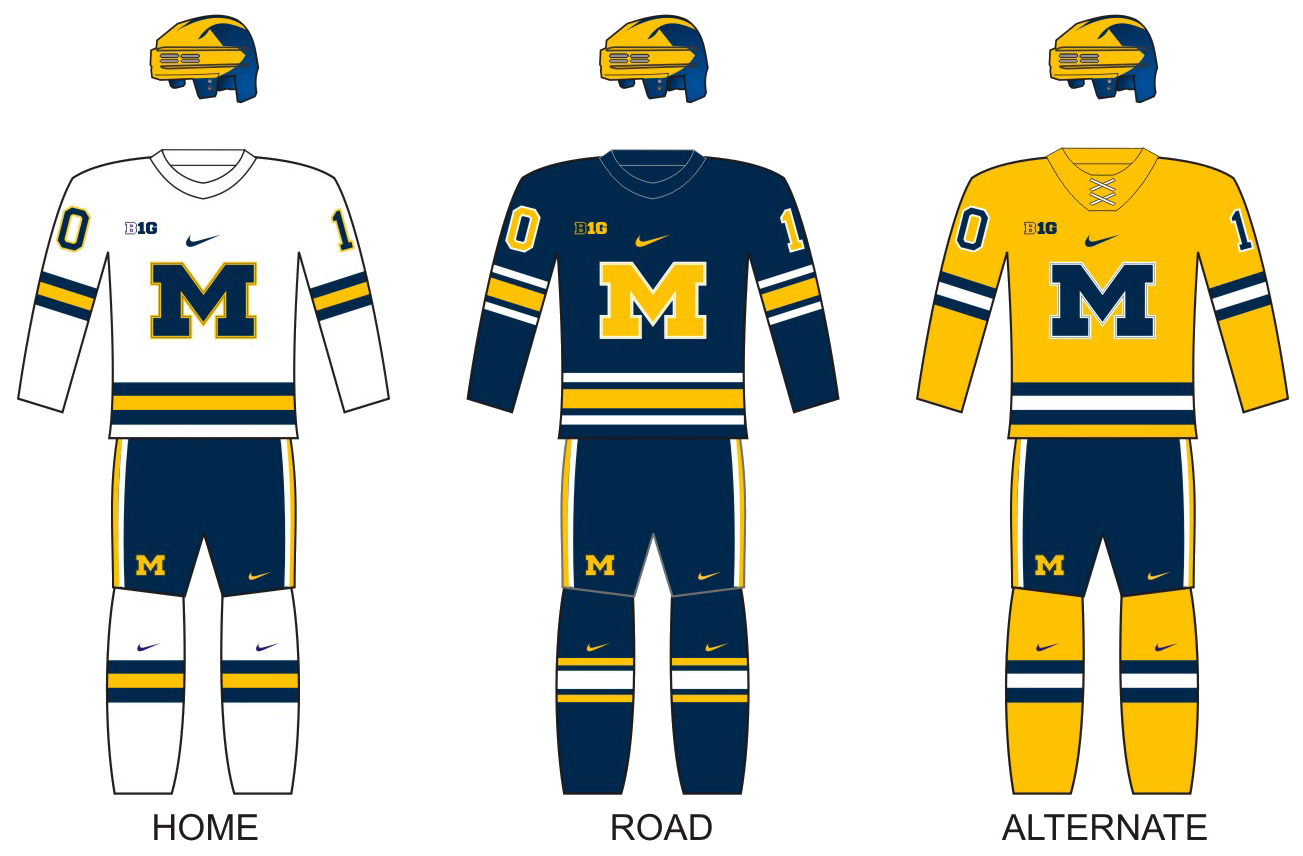

The University of Michigan Women's Ice Hockey team represents the University of Michigan (U-M) in Women's Division 1 of the American Collegiate Hockey Association (ACHA) and in the Central Collegiate Women's Hockey Association (CCWHA). The team was founded in 1994 and has been consistently strong throughout its existence, winning a pair of CCWHA playoff titles (in a total of ten appearances in the league championship game) and qualifying for 13 of the 18 ACHA National Tournaments held for women's teams, a number that ranks third all-time behind Massachusetts and Michigan State.

== History ==
=== Early Years (1994–2002) ===
The 1999–2000 CCWHA champion Wolverines

The Wolverines were co-founded in 1994 by Sue McDowell, who has remained involved with the team in various capacities throughout its existence (although, emphasizing the difficulty of assembling early club hockey records, Michigan State has claimed that its 1995 founding makes it the oldest women's club hockey team in the state of Michigan). McDowell, a Massachusetts native, moved to Michigan in 1985 and took a job in U-M's IT department as a faculty liaison. She was dismayed at the lack of girls hockey in her new home state, leading to her starting the Wolverines' team and becoming heavily involved in local youth programs.

In 1996–97, the Central Collegiate Women's Hockey Association was formed (notably pre-dating the women's hockey championships of both the ACHA and NCAA, as well as nearly every other women's college hockey conference), featuring Michigan as one of its charter members and the only team that has participated in each league season to date. The CCWHA provided an unprecedented level of organization and structure to an era when teams often filled out hodgepodge schedules with amateur adult teams and often did not have any sort of championship competition at the end of each season. The Wolverines, along with arch rival Ohio State, were among the most immediately successful teams in the CCWHA. At the inaugural 1997 CCWHA tournament, U-M swept a pool including Western Michigan, Bowling Green and Illinois, then beat Michigan State in the semi-finals, before losing to OSU for the championship. The Buckeyes would go on to win the first three CCWHA titles before moving to NCAA Division I in 1999 and becoming a varsity program.

That development would prove beneficial to the Wolverines, who would become the CCWHA's dominant team over the next couple seasons. In 2000–01, U-M smashed their way to a 24–1–1 regular season mark (including an unbeaten conference record, as the team's only defeat was to non-league opponent Arizona State) before defeating hosting Lake Superior State, Michigan State and Western Michigan en route to the CCWHA playoff title. There was plenty of credit to go around for the success: Meghan Collier was the team's leading scorer with 49 goals among her 67 points, Jackie Neal led the way with 24 assists, and goalies Dana Aronson and Christine Granger largely split duties, posting goals against averages of 0.94 and 1.19, respectively. Michigan was an inaugural member of the ACHA's first women's division (initially called the "Women's Division," then "Women's Division 1" after a second women's division was added in 2006–07), which began play in that 2000–01 season and received the appropriate national spoils for a strong season. Collier became U-M's initial first team All-American, while the Wolverines received a bid to the ACHA National Tournament after finishing second in the ACHA's East Region (the team placed in the top spot for the first four periods before being edged out by Penn State in the fifth and final regular-season ranking).

At nationals, Michigan made history by participating in the opening game of the ACHA's first women's tournament, held in Wentzville, Missouri. Collier scored the first goal in tourney history, although the Wolverines had to settle for a tie with Colorado en route to a disappointing fifth-place finish, thanks largely to a 3–2 loss to Pittsburgh that saw U-M outshoot the Panthers 32–13.

=== A Brief Struggle (2002–2004) ===
Although it turned out to be a two-season blip relative to Michigan's typical success level, the Wolverines struggled during the 2002–03 and 2003–04 seasons, a period that saw the departure of CCWHA-winning coach Hal Krenkel, and the one-year tenure of Steve Wartecker. In 2002–03, despite a strong first half and a fourth straight trip to the conference championship game (a 1–0 loss to Michigan State), the Wolverines dropped from second in the central region to third in the final ranking period to miss the tournament. Under the selection format used at the time, the top two teams in each region were picked for nationals, with two wild cards (generally, the third-ranked team in two of the three regions) rounding out a field of eight. However, for the 2003 tournament, Western Michigan (ranked below Michigan at fifth in the central) received a hosting autobid, limiting things to just one wild card, the west region's St. Cloud State.

Despite the senior years of program legends like Collier and Neal, things went from near-miss to far-miss the following season. The 2003–04 schedule saw a disastrous 4–19–2 mark, with three of the four wins coming against a Notre Dame program that was a year away from going on hiatus.

=== A Winters-Era Turnaround (2004–2008) ===
Michigan's struggles would prove to be short-lived, thanks largely to new head coach Adam Winters (with Andrea Shear as co-coach during the first half of Winters' tenure) and a bevy of talented reinforcements. Players arriving at U-M in 2003 and 2004 included greats like Megan Lobeck, Lauren Lobert, Laine Schmid, Cheryl Mervich and Hillary Eagen. Jennifer Barnhart provided steady goaltending through the middle part of the decade, including being named the CCWHA's most valuable player in 2004–05, a season that saw her play every minute in the maize and blue crease.

In 2004–05, U-M got off to an inauspicious 1–6–1 start thanks in part to a tough schedule including Michigan State and Western Michigan, but the team's fortunes turned on a dime in early November and the Wolverines would only lose a pair of games through the remainder of the regular season, both to a powerful Northern Michigan team that would go on to the ACHA National Tournament. Key victories in the stretch included a 2–1 overtime result over Penn State on Darcy Utter's winner as well as the 6–0 win over Oakland that began the turnaround and featured two goals each from Schmid, Utter and Stacey Moses. At the end of the year, and following another CCWHA playoff run to the title game, Michigan ranked 11th nationally, but was initially bumped from the now-12-team field thanks once again to autobids – this time a host bid given to Buffalo (which was unranked) and another given to the University of Pennsylvania (ranked 14th) for winning the southeast region title. However, Penn declined their bid, allowing the Wolverines to sneak into nationals for the first time since 2002, although the trip ended quickly following losses to Massachusetts, Lindenwood and NMU. Still, Michigan's standard had been reset, and 2005 turned out to be the first of five straight trips to nationals, and 11 in 12 years through the 2015–16 season.

Subsequent seasons saw a lot of the same, as U-M finished second during the CCWHA regular season in three straight years from 2005–06 through 2006–08, and won exactly 18 games while playing for the CCWHA title in 2004–05, 2005–06 and 2007–08 (Michigan's ten appearances in the league championship game are a record, solidly ahead of Michigan State's seven, although the Wolverines have gone 2–8–0 in those contests). In 2008, U-M defeated MSU in the CCWHA playoff semifinals in dramatic fashion, with goaltender Maggie Wagner holding the Spartans to a single goal through the overtime period and stopping 4 of 5 shots in the shootout round to claim victory. In both 2005–06 and 2007–08, U-M advanced out of the pool round of the ACHA National Tournament but were defeated in the quarterfinals by, respectively, Rhode Island and Robert Morris (IL), two of the ACHA's powerhouses of the era. In 2007–08, Michigan finished with three All-Americans (Amy Cauzillo on the second team, Lauren Lobert and Maggie Wagner as honorable mentions) although Emily Nelson's arrival that year, which included a 23-goal freshman season, signaled a passing of the baton to the next generation of stars.

=== Blackburn Keeps The Beat Going (2008–2015) ===
In 2008–09, Rob Blackburn took over as head coach and his seven seasons in charge were marked by continuing success, as he led U-M to five winning records, six ACHA National Tournament appearances, and a pair of CCWHA championship games. As he began, much of the group that had fueled the Wolverines' mid-decade turnaround had moved on, but the squad quickly reloaded with players like Kristin Griebe, who arrived in 2009 and would go on to become Michigan's all-time leading scorer (in documented seasons) with 90 goals and 73 assists in 116 games. Beyond the point total, Griebe also achieved rarefied status in the accolade department, as she led U-M to a 19–8–4 mark (the team's best win total since 2001–02) and earned the school's second spot on the ACHA's All-American First Team, following Collier in 2000–01.

Blackburn proved adept as a recruiter, particularly in landing players who had begun their collegiate careers in NCAA Division III like Charlotte Hotaling (Manhattanville) and Monica Korzon (Plattsburgh State). Both Hotaling and Korzon arrived in Ann Arbor in 2011 and would be significant pieces of the team's core over the next couple years.

One of Michigan's best seasons came in 2014–15, a campaign that saw the Wolverines close the regular season with their highest-ever ACHA national ranking, third. A well-balanced squad featuring Jenna Trubiano, Kalli Bates, Jennifer Cusmano, Mercedes Reyes, Karrie Inman and Erin Gregoire made a spirited CCWHA tournament run that included overtime wins against eventual ACHA semifinalists Adrian (thanks to Trubiano's winner) and Grand Valley State (with Jessica Buckley the hero that time) before falling in the final to defending national champion Miami. Although the Wolverines ultimately bowed out of nationals in the pool round, it wasn't before one of the most stirring wins in recent program history. On March 5, 2015, in York, Pennsylvania, U-M trailed Minnesota 3–1 midway through the third period. Bates, with her team facing elimination, willed the game back by scoring twice in a 2:24 span to force overtime, where Gregoire cashed in a power play for the victory. However, that triumph would be one of only three ACHA nationals wins of the Blackburn era (one of which came post-elimination in 2013), against 15 losses.

=== Recent Seasons (2015–present) ===
After Blackburn's departure following 2014–15, program founder McDowell stepped into the head coaching role and was then joined by Terry Mathews for one season. The result in 2015–16 was a somewhat uneven year epitomized by a pair of early upsets. The first, on October 4, 2015, saw an unheralded Davenport team undo 2–0 and 3–2 Michigan leads to win 4–3 behind Lexie Boydston's three-point morning, including a shorthanded game-winning goal for the Panthers' first-ever victory against their cross-state rivals. A more encouraging outcome for the Wolverines came just four days later when U-M toppled third-ranked Adrian on the road and in overtime. With Michigan trailing 2–1 in the game's dying moments, Cusmano pushed home a rebound with just one second showing on the clock to force the extra period. Then, 19 seconds from a tie, Sarah Lather potted the winner in support of Bailey Hamill's 31 saves.

Goal scoring would rarely prove that timely for most of the year though, as Michigan only managed 61 over 25 ACHA games, 2.4 per contest. The efforts of Cusmano, Reyes and Inman (who combined for 29 goals of the 61) along with strong goaltending from Hamill and Julia Chenoweth, did wind up being just enough to push the Wolverines to their 13th nationals bid. However, thanks in part to Trubiano's long-term injury and an upset loss to Robert Morris at the CCWHA playoffs, U-M finished ninth in the ACHA rankings in 2016–17 to miss ACHAs for the first time since 2009–10. One season highlight came on February 18, 2017, when the Wolverines spoiled the senior night of eventual national champion Miami and the celebration of a class that would end up with the 2014, 2016 and 2017 ACHA titles, the 2014, 2015 and 2017 CCWHA titles, along with a host of individual honors. Nevertheless, goals by Camilla Vercollone, Rachel Hysong and Inman staked Michigan to an early 3–0 lead, and although the RedHawks rallied to force overtime, Reyes found a maize and blue winner there.

==== Potential NCAA Status and Criticism ====
The state of Michigan is notable for the fact that despite ranking fourth among the U.S. states in the total number of female players, it does not have a single NCAA Division I women's program. Because of this, and thanks largely to the historic success of the university's famed NCAA Division I men's program, U-M has often been the subject of speculation (and sometimes, criticism) concerning varsity status for women's hockey. The closest women's hockey came to becoming an NCAA program was early in the team's existence when, in 1997, the university considered the possibility but decided to make two other sports—women's soccer and women's water polo—varsity sports instead, citing the expense of women's hockey as the rationale for the decision. Another bid occurred in 2011, but U-M again declined women's hockey, this time in favor of women's lacrosse. In 2014, former Wolverines athletic director Dave Brandon said that financial considerations remain the primary obstacle for NCAA women's hockey at the school. Among the major expenses would be the construction of a new ice facility to supplement the single-sheet Yost Ice Arena and help meet that level's demands for available ice time and locker space.

Given the aforementioned realities concerning U-M's and the state of Michigan's stature in the hockey world, as well as the lack of NCAA Division I women's programs in the state, the school is often held up as a symbol of women's hockey growth struggles. On May 6, 2017, the New York Times published an article spotlighting the differences between U-M's top men's and women's hockey teams. The piece, most notably, cited the fact that the team receives none of its budget directly from the university's athletic department while requiring team members to pay $1600 each season to play. Players also conduct numerous fundraisers to meet expenses, including selling t-shirt, soliciting sponsorship money from local businesses and occasionally sweeping up the Crisler Center after U-M men's basketball games to defray expenses including travel, an annual ice bill of $20,000 from Yost Ice Arena and a $3000 stipend paid to the squad's head coach (contrasted with the $238,702 former men's coach Red Berenson made in 2014). Beyond financial concerns, the team does not have a permanent locker facility at their cramped, nearly-century-old rink, and even requests for more feasible space, like a display case, have been denied.

== Season by Season Results ==
| Won Championship | Lost Championship | Regular Season Conference Champions |

| Year | Coach | W | L | T | Conference | Conf. W | Conf. L | Conf. T | Finish | Conference Tournament | ACHA Tournament |
| 2025–26 | Bill Bonser | 10 | 8 | 2 | CCWHA | | | | TBD | TBD | TBD |
| 2024–25 | Jenna Trubiano, Bill Bonser | 12 | 14 | 0 | CCWHA | | | | 3rd | Won First Round vs. University of Miami-Ohio (4–3); Lost Semifinals vs. Indiana Tech (0–4) | Did Not Qualify |
| 2023–24 | Jenna Trubiano | 17 | 5 | 1 | CCWHA | | | | 4th | Won First Round vs. University of Miami-Ohio (4–3); Lost Semifinals vs. Indiana Tech (0–3) | Qualified 9th Place Nationally Lost Day 1 vs. Minot State University (1–2) Lost Day 2 vs. UM-Dearborn (1–2) |
| 2022–23 | Jenna Trubiano | 20 | 6 | 2 | CCWHA | | | | 2nd | Won First Round vs. Grand Valley State (3–0); Lost Semifinals vs. Indiana Tech (2–3) | Qualified 9th Place Nationally Lost Day 1 vs. Adrian (2–4) Lost Day 2 vs. McKendree University (2–1) in OT |
| 2021–22 | Jenna Trubiano | 10 | 8 | 2 | CCWHA | | | | 3rd | Won First Round vs. Miami-OH (3–2 2OT); Lost Semifinals vs. Indiana Tech (0–3) | Did not qualify |
| 2020–21 | No official season (COVID) | – | – | – | CCWHA | – | – | – | – | – | – |
| 2019–20 | Gary Quitiquit | | | | CCWHA | 5 | 9 | 0 | 5th | Lost First Round vs. Grand Valley (1–2) | Did not qualify |
| 2018–19 | Gary Quitiquit | | | | CCWHA | 5 | 9 | 0 | 5th | Did not qualify | Did not qualify |
| 2017–18 | Joe Kolet | 11 | 13 | 2 | CCWHA | 4 | 8 | 2 | 6th | Lost First Round vs. Miami (0–1) | Did not qualify |
| 2016–17 | Joe Kolet | 11 | 11 | 0 | CCWHA | 8 | 6 | 0 | 4th | Lost First Round vs. Robert Morris (IL) (1–4) | Did not qualify |
| 2015–16 | Terry Mathews | 10 | 11 | 4 | CCWHA | 6 | 6 | 2 | 4th | Won First Round vs. Michigan State (5–1); Lost Semifinals vs. Miami (0–3) | Lost Pool Round vs. Liberty (2–5); Lost Pool Round vs. Grand Valley State (1–5); Lost Pool Round vs. Lindenwood-Belleville (4–6) |
| 2014–15 | Rob Blackburn | 16 | 9 | 1 | CCWHA | 9 | 4 | 1 | 2nd | Won Upper Semifinals vs. Adrian (4–3 OT); Lost Upper Final vs. Miami (0–2); Won Lower Final vs. Grand Valley State (3–2 OT); Lost Championship vs. Miami (2–4) | Lost Pool Round vs. Adrian (0–3); Won Pool Round vs. Minnesota (4–3 OT); Lost Pool Round vs. Miami (1–3) |
| 2013–14 | Rob Blackburn | 14 | 8 | 5 | CCWHA | 12 | 3 | 3 | 3rd | Won Pool Round vs. Michigan State (4–2); Tied Pool Round vs. Davenport (4–4); Tied Pool Round vs. Robert Morris (IL) (4–4) | Lost Pool Round vs. Rhode Island (1–4); Lost Pool Round vs. Miami (3–6); Lost Pool Round vs. Michigan State (2–3 OT) |
| 2012–13 | Rob Blackburn | 19 | 8 | 4 | CCWHA | 12 | 3 | 3 | 2nd | Lost Pool Round vs. Grand Valley State (1–2); Tied Pool Round vs. Ohio State (3–3); Won Pool Round vs. Miami (5–1) | Lost Pool Round vs. Liberty (1–3); Lost Pool Round vs. Minnesota (1–6); Won Pool Round vs. Rhode Island (4–2) |
| 2011–12 | Rob Blackburn | 15 | 10 | 2 | CCWHA | 8 | 4 | 2 | 3rd | Won Pool Round vs. Grand Valley State (5–2); Won Pool Round vs. W. Michigan (7–1); Lost Pool Round vs. Robert Morris (0–2); Won Semi-Finals vs. Michigan State (2–1 OT); Lost Championship vs. Robert Morris (0–3) | Lost Pool Round vs. Rhode Island (1–5); Lost Pool Round vs. Robert Morris (IL) (0–5); Lost Pool Round vs. Massachusetts (2–3) |
| 2010–11 | Rob Blackburn | 11 | 14 | 2 | CCWHA | 7 | 6 | 1 | 5th | Tied Pool Round vs. Robert Morris (IL) (3–3); Lost Pool Round vs. Michigan State (1–5) | Lost Pool Round vs. Lindenwood (0–5); Lost Pool Round vs. Rhode Island (3–6); Lost Pool Round vs. Grand Valley State (1–4) |
| 2009–10 | Rob Blackburn | 11 | 9 | 1 | CCWHA | 7 | 4 | 1 | 3rd | Lost Pool Round vs. Lindenwood (2–4); Won Pool Round vs. Western Michigan (6–0); Lost Pool Round vs. Michigan State (0–1) | Did not qualify |
| 2008–09 | Rob Blackburn | 12 | 14 | 1 | CCWHA | 5 | 6 | 1 | 4th | Lost Pool Round vs. Grand Valley State (1–5); Lost Pool Round vs. Lindenwood (0–4); Won Consolation vs. Northern Michigan (5–3) | Lost Pool Round vs. Lindenwood (0–4); Won Pool Round vs. Ohio State (2–1 OT); Lost Quarterfinals vs. Robert Morris (IL) (0–2) |
| 2007–08 | Adam Winters | 18 | 10 | 2 | CCWHA | 8 | 4 | 0 | 3rd | Won Pool Round vs. Western Michigan (5–2); Won Pool Round vs. Northern Michigan (7–2); Won Semifinals vs. Michigan State (2–1 SO); Lost Championship vs. Lindenwood (0–4) | Lost Pool Round vs. Rhode Island (2–3); Won Pool Round vs. Northern Michigan (5–0); Lost Quarterfinals vs. Robert Morris (IL) (1–4) |
| 2006–07 | Adam Winters | 11 | 15 | 2 | CCWHA | 8 | 2 | 2 | 2nd | Lost Pool Round vs. Ohio State (1–2); Won Pool Round vs. Northern Michigan (9–2); Lost Pool Round vs. Western Michigan (1–7) | Lost Pool Round vs. Robert Morris (IL) (1–6); Lost Pool Round vs. Massachusetts (0–4); Lost Consolation vs. Western Michigan (1–6) |
| 2005–06 | Adam Winters; Andrea Shear | 18 | 13 | 3 | CCWHA | 10 | 5 | 2 | 2nd | Won Pool Round vs. Northern Michigan (3–2); Won Pool Round vs. Ohio State (3–1); Won Pool Round vs. Western Michigan (5–4); Won Pool Round vs. Michigan State (White) (8–0); Lost Championship vs. Western Michigan (2–3 OT) | Lost Pool Round vs. Robert Morris (IL) (1–8); Won Pool Round vs. Maryland (6–1); Lost Quarterfinals vs. Rhode Island (1–5) |
| 2004–05 | Adam Winters; Andrea Shear | 18 | 12 | 3 | CCWHA | 11 | 7 | 2 | 3rd | Won Pool Round vs. Northern Michigan (4–1); Won Pool Round vs. Western Michigan (3–2); Won Pool Round vs. Michigan State (White) (8–0); Won Pool Round vs. Ohio State (1–0); Lost Championship vs. Western Michigan (1–4) | Lost Pool Round vs. Massachusetts (1–3); Lost Pool Round vs. Lindenwood (2–10); Lost Consolation vs. Northern Michigan (2–3) |
| 2003–04 | Steve Wartecker | 4 | 19 | 2 | CCWHA | 3 | 15 | 2 | 5th | Lost Pool Round vs. Northern Michigan (0–5); Lost Pool Round vs. Western Michigan (2–5); Won Consolation vs. Notre Dame (6–1) | Did not qualify |
| 2002–03 | Hal Krenkel | | | | CCWHA | | | | 3rd | Won Pool Round vs. Western Michigan (4–2); Lost Pool Round vs. Northern Michigan (2–3); Won Semifinals vs. Oakland (5–3); Lost Championship vs. Michigan State (0–1) | Did not qualify |
| 2001–02 | Hal Krenkel | 20 | 7 | 4 | CCWHA | 12 | 4 | 4 | 2nd | Won Pool Round vs. Northern Michigan (2–1); Won Pool Round vs. Western Michigan (5–2); Won Pool Round vs. Oakland (3–0); Lost Championship vs. Michigan State (0–2) | Lost Pool Round vs. St. Cloud State (1–3); Lost Pool Round vs. Boston University (1–2); Won Pool Round vs. Colorado (2–1); Lost Fifth Place vs. Michigan State (3–4 OT) |
| 2000–01 | Hal Krenkel | 30 | 3 | 2 | CCWHA | 19 | 0 | 1 | 1st | Won Pool Round vs. Lake Superior State (9–0); Lost Pool Round vs. Western Michigan (0–3); Won Pool Round vs. Michigan State (3–1); Won Championship vs. Western Michigan (2–0, 4–1) | Tied Pool Round vs. Colorado (3–3); Lost Pool Round vs. Pittsburgh (2–3); Won Pool Round vs. St. Cloud State (1–0); Won Fifth Place vs. Wisconsin (1–0 Forfeit) |
| 1999–00 | MaryBeth Collins | | | | CCWHA | | | | 1st | Won Pool Round vs. Lake Superior State (3–2); Won Pool Round vs. Ohio State (15–0); Won Championship vs. Western Michigan (4–1) | |
| 1998–99 | MaryBeth Collins | | | | CCWHA | | | | | Lost Pool Round vs. Michigan State (0–1) | |
| 1997–98 | Kate Pinhey (Begeman) | | | | CCWHA | | | | | | |
| 1996–97 | Kate Pinhey (Begeman) | 9 | 6 | 2 | CCWHA – full season | 8 | 5 | 2 | 2nd | Won Pool Round vs. Bowling Green; Won Pool Round vs. Western Michigan (12–4); Won Pool Round vs. Illinois; Won Semifinals vs. Michigan State; Lost Championship vs. Ohio State | National Tourney not yet ACHA event: 0–3–0: Lost to North Country Comm College, St. Cloud State and MIT |
| 1995–96 | Bill Petrere | 6 | 7 | | CCWHA exhibition: First recorded game 12/1/95 | | | | | | |

== Program records ==
As of May 9, 2017. ACHA games only, beginning with the 2003–04 season.

=== Career scoring leaders ===
| Name | Years | Games | Goals | Assists | Points |
| Kristin Griebe | 2009–14 | 116 | 90 | 73 | 163 |
| Joslyn Neal | 2007–12 | 119 | 58 | 66 | 124 |
| Julia Lindahl | 2022–present | 102 | 69 | 51 | 120 |
| Emily Nelson | 2007–11 | 94 | 71 | 41 | 112 |
| Monica Korzon | 2012–15 | 72 | 43 | 56 | 99 |
| Jennifer Cusmano | 2012–16 | 108 | 48 | 42 | 90 |
| Megan Lobeck | 2004–08 | 96 | 34 | 55 | 89 |
| Kris Vaclavek | 2009–13 | 106 | 43 | 37 | 80 |
| Jenna Trubiano | 2013–18 | 76 | 43 | 27 | 70 |
| Lauren Lobert | 2004–08 | 93 | 38 | 31 | 69 |
| Hilliary Inger | 2006–10 | 81 | 36 | 33 | 69 |
| Cheryl Mervich | 2003–07 | 93 | 34 | 34 | 68 |
| Hillary Eagen | 2004–08 | 95 | 35 | 32 | 67 |
| Laine Schmid | 2003–08 | 117 | 29 | 30 | 59 |
| Amy Cauzillo | 2005–09 | 93 | 22 | 37 | 59 |
| Mercedes Reyes | 2014–18 | 70 | 21 | 30 | 51 |
| Sam Carr | 2023–present | 77 | 33 | 21 | 54 |
| Emily Maliszewski | 2022–present | 102 | 19 | 35 | 54 |
| Elizabeth Novak | 2008–13 | 130 | 20 | 31 | 51 |
| Kalli Bates | 2011–15 | 103 | 20 | 30 | 50 |
| Mariah Evans | 2019–23 | 69 | 25 | 22 | 47 |
| Karrie Inman | 2013–17 | 100 | 21 | 26 | 47 |
| Jessie Buckley | 2010–15 | 134 | 10 | 36 | 46 |
| Kate Zemenick | 2007–11 | 80 | 20 | 24 | 44 |
| Rachel Reuter | 2006–11 | 121 | 13 | 29 | 42 |
| Charlotte Hotaling | 2011–13 | 44 | 20 | 19 | 39 |
| Megan Mathews | 2021–24 | 69 | 20 | 19 | 39 |
| Erin Proctor | 2019–23 | 60 | 21 | 16 | 37 |
| Leah Krieger | 2013–16 | 75 | 18 | 19 | 37 |
| Jennifer Chronis | 2008–12 | 101 | 15 | 22 | 37 |
| Ana Harris | 2011–14 | 78 | 14 | 23 | 37 |

=== Single season scoring leaders ===
| Name | Year | Games | Goals | Assists | Points |
| Monica Korzon | 2012–13 | 29 | 21 | 24 | 45 |
| Kristin Griebe | 2012–13 | 23 | 25 | 17 | 42 |
| Kristin Griebe | 2010–11 | 27 | 16 | 21 | 37 |
| Cheryl Mervich | 2005–06 | 33 | 18 | 18 | 36 |
| Emily Nelson | 2007–08 | 26 | 23 | 12 | 35 |
| Jenna Trubiano | 2013–14 | 26 | 21 | 14 | 35 |
| Monica Korzon | 2013–14 | 26 | 15 | 20 | 35 |
| Emily Nelson | 2010–11 | 23 | 20 | 14 | 34 |
| Julia Lindahl | 2025–26 | 19 | 22 | 11 | 33 |
| Joslyn Neal | 2007–08 | 28 | 17 | 15 | 32 |
| Joslyn Neal | 2010–11 | 27 | 16 | 16 | 32 |
| Megan Lobeck | 2005–06 | 25 | 12 | 20 | 32 |
| Kristin Griebe | 2009–10 | 20 | 20 | 11 | 31 |
| Charlotte Hotaling | 2012–13 | 29 | 17 | 14 | 31 |
| Kris Vaclavek | 2010–11 | 27 | 17 | 13 | 30 |
| Lauren Lobert | 2007–08 | 28 | 18 | 11 | 29 |
| Kristin Griebe | 2011–12 | 23 | 17 | 11 | 28 |
| Julia Lindahl | 2022–23 | 28 | 19 | 8 | 27 |
| Jenna Trubiano | 2014–15 | 26 | 16 | 9 | 25 |
| Jennifer Cusmano | 2012–13 | 29 | 13 | 12 | 25 |
| Kristin Griebe | 2013–14 | 23 | 12 | 13 | 25 |
| Julia Lindahl | 2022–23 | 24 | 12 | 13 | 25 |
| Kris Vaclavek | 2011–12 | 31 | 16 | 8 | 24 |
| Hilliary Inger | 2007–08 | 28 | 13 | 11 | 24 |
| Joslyn Neal | 2011–12 | 22 | 9 | 15 | 24 |
| Lucy Hanson | 2023–24 | 24 | 14 | 10 | 24 |
| Megan Lobeck | 2007–08 | 28 | 7 | 17 | 24 |
| Jennifer Cusmano | 2013–14 | 28 | 14 | 9 | 23 |
| Emily Nelson | 2009–10 | 20 | 12 | 11 | 23 |
| Samantha Carr | 2023-24 | 24 | 14 | 4 | 18 |

=== Notable Goaltenders ===
| Name | Years | Minutes | Saves | Save Pct. | GAA | Shutouts |
| Sandrine Ponnath | 2021–2025 | 4163.00 | 1974 | 0.948 | 1.69 | 16 |
| Kelsey Duggan | 2011–15 | 3974.03 | 1152 | 0.888 | 2.20 | 14 |
| Hannah Robbins | 2008–11^{+} | 3521.62 | 1038 | 0.845 | 3.24 | 10 |
| Kathy Ross | 2010–13 | 3087.63 | 1131 | 0.913 | 2.10 | 6 |
| Jennifer Barnhart | 2003–06^ | 2118.23 | 859 | 0.853 | 4.19 | 2 |
| Bailey Hamill | 2015–19 | 1611.32 | 597 | 0.892 | 2.68 | 3 |
| Julia Chenoweth | 2015–16 | 985.00 | 250 | 0.847 | 2.74 | 0 |
| Maggie Wagner | 2005–09^{+} | 713.58 | 186 | 0.861 | 2.52 | 1 |
| Madeline Chen | 2016–17 | 269.08 | 110 | 0.887 | 3.12 | 1 |
| Katie Caskey | 2005–06^{+} | 255.00 | 77 | 0.885 | 2.35 | 0 |

^ Career includes games prior to the 2003–04 season.

+ Career includes games in the 2006–07 and/or 2007–08 seasons, during which the ACHA did not accurately track goaltending statistics.

== ACHA ranking history ==
=== National rankings ===
The ACHA began compiling a national ranking in 2003–04, issued four times per season, with the top twelve (from 2003–04 through 2008–09) or eight (from 2009–10 on) in the fourth ranking, released in February, receiving a bid to the ACHA National Tournament. A preseason ranking was initiated beginning with 2014–15. Beginning with the 2016–17 season, the ACHA tabulated rankings each week during the season and issued them on Tuesdays following weekends including games.

| Year | Ranking | | | | | | | | | | | | | | | | | |
| Year | Pre | 1 | 2 | 3 | 4 | 5 | 6 | 7 | 8 | 9 | 10 | 11 | 12 | 13 | 14 | 15 | 16 | 17 |
|---|---|---|---|---|---|---|---|---|---|---|---|---|---|---|---|---|---|---|
| 2003–04 | | RV | RV | RV | 15 | | | | | | | | | | | | | |
| 2004–05 | | 14 | 13 | 11 | 11 | | | | | | | | | | | | | |
| 2005–06 | | 10 | 7 | 8 | 8 | | | | | | | | | | | | | |
| 2006–07 | | 12 | 9 | 7 | 8 | | | | | | | | | | | | | |
| 2007–08 | | 4 | 6 | 5 | 8 | | | | | | | | | | | | | |
| 2008–09 | | 8 | 10 | 8 | 8 | | | | | | | | | | | | | |
| 2009–10 | | 9 | 9 | 9 | 9 | | | | | | | | | | | | | |
| 2010–11 | | 10 | 8 | 10 | 8 | | | | | | | | | | | | | |
| 2011–12 | | 8 | 8 | 8 | 6 | | | | | | | | | | | | | |
| 2012–13 | | 4 | 5 | 6 | 8 | | | | | | | | | | | | | |
| 2013–14 | | 11 | 8 | 8 | 6 | | | | | | | | | | | | | |
| 2014–15 | 4 | 5 | 10 | 5 | 3 | | | | | | | | | | | | | |
| 2015–16 | 8 | 7 | 8 | 8 | 8 | | | | | | | | | | | | | |
| 2016–17 | 9 | 9 | 9 | 9 | 9 | 9 | 11 | 11 | 12 | 13 | 11 | 11 | 9 | 8 | 9 | 10 | 7 | 9 |
| 2017–18 | 9 | 10 | 10 | 10 | 10 | 10 | 12 | 10 | 11 | 11 | 11 | 9 | 10 | 10 | 10 | 8 | 10 | |
| 2018–19 | | 11 | 12 | 15 | 13 | 13 | 11 | 11 | 10 | 11 | | | | | | | | |
| 2021–22 | | 14 | 14 | 14 | 14 | 14 | 13 | 13 | | | | | | | | | | |
| 2022–23 | 13 | 6 | 6 | 10 | 6 | 6 | 7 | 6 | 6 | 9 | | | | | | | | |
| 2023–24 | | 4 | 5 | 4 | 4 | 4 | 6 | 6 | 7 | 6 | 9 | 9 | | | | | | |
| 2024–25 | | 5 | 5 | 6 | 4 | 8 | 8 | 8 | 8 | 9 | 10 | 12 | 13 | 12 | 12 | 13 | | |
| 2025–26 | | 11 | 10 | 11 | 12 | 15 | 13 | 13 | 15 | 14 | 15 | 15 | | | | | | |

=== Regional rankings ===
From 2000–01 through 2002–03, regional rankings were the sole method for determining ACHA National Tournament bids. The inaugural 2000–01 season featured teams divided into East and West Regions (Michigan was sorted into the East), with the top four from each in February's final ranking invited to nationals. For 2001–02 and 2002–03, the setup was expanded to include East, Central and West Regions, with U-M moved to the Central Region that it would occupy through 2009–10. Under that system, the top two from each region were invited to nationals, along with two wild card teams. In 2003–04, the tournament field was expanded to 12 teams, and a national ranking was introduced. The latter development diminished the importance of the regional rankings, as the national rankings were used to determine nationals bids. Regional champions were still awarded an autobid, however, even if ranked outside of the top 12 nationally. In 2004–05, growth in the number of ACHA women's teams resulted in an increase to four regions – Northeast, Southeast, Central and West – although things reverted to East, Central and West in 2007–08. The 2009–10 season was notable both for the fact that the tournament field was reduced back to eight teams and as the final year of the regional system, which had become largely antiquated as regional champions generally had little issue placing highly in the national rankings.

| Year | Ranking | | | | |
| Year | 1 | 2 | 3 | 4 | 5 |
|---|---|---|---|---|---|
| 2000–01 | 1E | 1E | 1E | 1E | 2E |
| 2001–02 | 2C | 2C | 2C | 1C | 2C |
| 2002–03 | 2C | 2C | 2C | 3C | |
| 2003–04 | 6C | 6C | 6C | 6C | |
| 2004–05 | 4C | 5C | 5C | 5C | |
| 2005–06 | 3C | 3C | 4C | 4C | |
| 2006–07 | 5C | 4C | 4C | 4C | |
| 2007–08 | 2C | 2C | 2C | 3C | |
| 2008–09 | 3C | 4C | 3C | 3C | |
| 2009–10 | 4C | 4C | 4C | | |

== ACHA national honors ==
=== Annual Awards ===
All-Americans and All-Tournament selections including all seasons except 2008–09. Academic All-Americans including all seasons except 2007–08, 2008–09, 2015–16, 2018–19, 2019–20 and 2020–21.

Academic All-American

- Mary Catherine Finney – 2005–06
- Hillary Eagen – 2006–07
- Joslyn Neal – 2009–10, 2010–11, 2011–12
- Kate Zemenick – 2009–10, 2010–11
- Mackenzie Melvin – 2009–10, 2010–11
- Hannah Robbins – 2009–10, 2010–11
- Hilliary Inger – 2009–10
- Aubrey (Kowalski) Scott – 2010–11, 2011–12
- Jennifer Chronis – 2010–11, 2011–12
- Karrie Inman – 2016–17
- Ania Dow – 2016–17
- Caroline Hurd – 2016–17
- Carolyn Andonian – 2016–17
- Anna Mondrusov – 2016–17
- Carolyn Andonian – 2017–18
- Jane Dow – 2017–18
- Caroline Hurd – 2017–18
- Emma Kaznowski – 2017–18
- Mady McEachern – 2017–18
- Brooke Pierce – 2017–18
- Julia Freeman – 2021–22
- Mary Claire Shorkey – 2021–22
- Katie Christiansen – 2021–22
- Annabel Levinson – 2021–22, 2022–23
- Lydia Forhan – 2021–22, 2022–23
- Robin Goldman – 2021–22, 2022–23, 2023–24
- Sophie Williams – 2021–22, 2022–23
- Jamie McCarthy – 2021–22, 2022–23
- Anna Thomas – 2021–22
- Miki Rubin – 2021–22, 2022–23
- Sam Kroon – 2021–22
- Erin Proctor – 2021–22, 2022–23
- Jordan Eliason – 2021–22, 2022–23
- Jessy Simmer – 2021–22, 2022–23, 2023–24
- Mariah Evans – 2021–22, 2022–23
- Ava Gargiulo – 2022–23
- Leslie Ried – 2022–23
- Meg Brice – 2022–23, 2023–24
- Emily Maliszewski – 2023–24
- Lauren McCallig – 2023–24
- Lucy Hanson – 2023–24
- Allison Fleszar – 2023–24
- Menami Gordon – 2023–24
- Isabelle German – 2023–24
- Mariana Ceballos – 2023–24
- Sandrine Ponnath – 2023–24

First Team All-American

- Meghan Collier – 2000–01
- Kristin Griebe – 2012–13

Second Team All-American

- Amy Cauzillo – 2007–08
- Emily Nelson – 2010–11
- Kalli Bates – 2014–15
- Sandrine Ponnath – 2021–22, 2022–23

Second Team All-Rookie

- Julia Lindahl – 2022–23
- Lucy Hanson – 2023–24

All-American Honorable Mention

- Cheryl Mervich – 2005–06
- Mary Catherine Finney – 2005–06
- Lauren Lobert – 2007–08
- Maggie Wagner – 2007–08

Second Team All-Tournament

- Monica Korzon – 2013–14

All-Tournament Honorable Mention

- Meghan Collier – 2000–01, 2001–02
- Tory DeLeeuw – 2000–01
- Jackie Day – 2001–02
- Jennifer Barnhart – 2004–05
- Stacy Moses – 2004–05
- Amy Cauzillo – 2005–06
- Megan Lobeck – 2006–07
- Lauren Lobert – 2006–07
- Katie Caskey – 2006–07
- Emily Nelson – 2007–08
- Kate Zemenick – 2007–08
- Maggie Wagner – 2007–08

=== Monthly awards ===
During the 2013–14, 2014–15 and 2015–16 seasons, the ACHA presented a series of monthly awards for both men's and women's divisions.

Sher-Wood Freshman Spotlight
- Jenna Trubiano – December 2013

== Conference honors ==
Incomplete data. All-season years included are 2001–02, 2004–05, 2005–06, 2013–14, 2014–15, 2015–16, 2016–17, 2017–18, and 2022–23. All-tournament years included are 2002–03, 2007–08, 2012–13, 2013–14, 2014–15, 2015–16, 2016–17, 2017–18 and 2022–23.

CCWHA Most Valuable Player

- Jennifer Barnhart – 2004–05

CCWHA Goaltender of the Year

- Corie D'Angelo – 2001–02

CCWHA Coach of the Year

- Jenna Trubiano – 2022–23

First Team All-CCWHA

- Corie D'Angelo – 2001–02
- Stacy Moses – 2004–05
- Megan Lobeck – 2005–06
- Mary Catherine Finney – 2005–06
- Monica Korzon – 2014–15
- Sandrine Ponnath – 2021–22, 2022–23
- Katie German – 2022–23, 2023–24

Second Team All-CCWHA

- Meghan Collier – 2001–02
- Darcy Utter – 2004–05
- Ashley Wright – 2004–05
- Mary Catherine Finney – 2004–05
- Kristin DeLong – 2005–06
- Jennifer Barnhart – 2004–05, 2005–06
- Jenna Trubiano – 2013–14
- Kalli Bates – 2014–15
- Jennifer Cusmano – 2015–16
- Grace Nardiello – 2017–18
- Mariah Evans – 2021–22
- Julia Lindahl – 2022–23
- Sandrine Ponnath – 2023–24

First Team All-CCWHA Tournament

- Meghan Collier – 2002–03
- Jackie Neal – 2002–03
- Emily Nelson – 2007–08
- Amy Cauzillo – 2007–08
- Charlotte Hotaling – 2012–13
- Jennifer Cusmano – 2014–15, 2015–16

Second Team All-CCWHA Tournament

- Emily Roland – 2002–03
- Katie Pawlik – 2007–08
- Monica Korzon – 2012–13, 2013–14
- Jessie Buckley – 2013–14
- Jenna Trubiano – 2014–15, 2015–16
- Sarah Girard – 2016–17
- Bailey Hamill – 2017–18
- Julia Lindahl – 2022–23

== World University Games selections ==
Monica Korzon was picked for Team USA at World University Games twice, captaining the 2015 squad

Since 2011, the ACHA has supplied players for the U.S. National University Select Women's Team, which competes at the World University Games women's hockey tournament, held biennially and as part of the multi-sport event for college and university student-athletes.

Five different Michigan players and one coach have been picked for Team USA a total of seven times. Emily Nelson represented U-M on the 2011 squad, the first women's team USA Hockey sent to the tournament, and potted a pair of goals for the fourth-place finishers, both in a rout of host team Turkey. In 2013, the selections expanded to include then-head coach Rob Blackburn (as an assistant on the US staff), along with Monica Korzon, Kristin Griebe and Kalli Bates. Those Wolverines were part of a history-making squad that became the first Americans to medal at WUG in the modern era and using ACHA players (a period that began in 2001 on the men's side). Korzon scored twice during the event, and while one (assisted by Bates) came late in a blowout of Spain, the other was the opening goal in the bronze medal game, a 3–1 win over Japan. Another key win by Team USA in 2013 was a tourney-opening 4–2 victory over a Russian squad featuring several players who have been members of the senior Russia women's national ice hockey team.

In 2015, Korzon became the first (and, to date, only) Wolverine to be picked for WUG a second time, and she captained Team USA to a fifth-place finish while lodging a trio of assists in a consolation-round-clinching victory over Spain, with stateside teammate Eleanor Chalifoux scoring in the game.

| Year | Location | Player | Result |
|---|---|---|---|
| 2011 | Erzurum, Turkey | (United States) Emily Nelson | Fourth Place |
| 2013 | Trentino, Italy | (United States) Kalli Bates | Bronze Medal |
| 2013 | Trentino, Italy | (United States) Kristin Griebe | Bronze Medal |
| 2013 | Trentino, Italy | (United States) Monica Korzon | Bronze Medal |
| 2013 | Trentino, Italy | (United States) Rob Blackburn (asst. coach) | Bronze Medal |
| 2015 | Granada, Spain | (United States) Monica Korzon | Fifth Place |
| 2015 | Granada, Spain | (United States) Eleanor Chalifoux | Fifth Place |

== Rivalries ==
=== Michigan State ===
Michigan and Michigan State played each other in a snowy outdoor game on December 6, 2010

Michigan and Michigan State are two of the ACHA's top three schools in all-time national tournament appearances (13 and 14, respectively), although MSU has twice claimed the national championship that has proven elusive for the Wolverines. U-M has faced the Spartans twice at nationals, with both ending in MSU overtime wins. The more recent of the pair came in 2014 with both teams already eliminated from advancement out of the pool stage, while 2002's fifth-place game saw an Andrea Deshong winner. The teams have also met twice with the CCWHA title on the line. Third-period goals by Mindy McCarthy and Susan Schutter delivered the 2002 crown to the Spartans, who then repeated with a 1–0 victory the next year.

The series was hindered for a brief time beginning in 2004–05 when Michigan State pulled its top team (then called the Green team) out of the CCWHA to play an independent schedule while placing its second team (then called the White team) in its spot. MSU White was generally far less of a factor in the league, as evidenced by U-M's 10–0–0 record and aggregate 61–4 scoreline against that squad over its two CCWHA seasons (Michigan did continue to schedule MSU Green as well during this period, although meetings were more intermittent). In 2007–08, the Spartans A team re-joined the CCWHA and remains in the conference today. U-M and MSU were well matched all that season, culminating in a thrilling Wolverines shootout victory over the Spartans in the CCWHA semifinals.

On December 6, 2010, Michigan and Michigan State played an outdoor game at Michigan Stadium, U-M's football venue. The contest, won 4–3 by the Spartans, was part of the festivities leading up to The Big Chill at the Big House between the schools' men's NCAA Division I hockey teams. Another wrinkle enhancing the rivalry relates to former U-M coach Rob Blackburn, who accepted the head coaching position with the Spartans in 2015–16, immediately following his departure from Michigan.

In 2016–17, Michigan and Michigan State split two scheduled games, with the Wolverines win coming on a Mercedes Reyes overtime goal on February 11, 2017.

=== Ohio State ===
A plaque has commemorated the winner of the season series between Ohio State and Michigan since 2004–05

A natural rivalry thanks to existing antipathy between the two universities (due mostly to the well-known football rivalry between the schools), the Michigan–Ohio State series in women's hockey has nevertheless been marked largely by inconsistency interrupted with occasional bursts of heat. OSU won the first three CCWHA playoff titles, defeating the Wolverines in the final of the inaugural 1996–97 season, but the rivalry went on hiatus for a few years immediately following the 1998–99 season when the Buckeyes moved their team to NCAA Division I. Ohio State rejoined the CCWHA (and joined the ACHA, which did not exist for women's hockey in 1999) with a separate team in 2004–05, and in the several seasons that followed, the rivalry enjoyed some of its best years. The Buckeyes were the 2006–07 CCWHA champions (which involved a win over U-M at the league tournament), while the Wolverines returned the favor two years later with an overtime win at the 2009 ACHA National Tournament, the only time the teams have met at nationals. However, Ohio State has not defeated Michigan since the 2011–12 season as the balance of the series has lately tilted heavily in the maize and blue direction.

=== Western Michigan ===
The series between Michigan and the Kalamazoo, MI-based opponent has been dormant since WMU disbanded its team in 2012. But, for a time, Michigan–Western Michigan games defined the CCWHA race in a way that not even the better-known Michigan State and Ohio State rivalries could match. From 1997 through 2008, the two schools combined for a whopping 14 appearances in the league title game (of 24 total spots available over the 12-year run). They went head to head for the trophy on four occasions: Michigan defeated WMU for both of its titles in 2000 and 2001, while the Broncos returned the favor while winning their only titles in 2005 and 2006. In all situations, the teams met 14 documented times in the CCWHA playoffs, with the Wolverines holding a 9–5–0 advantage. One demonstration of the evenly-matched nature of the opponents was that prior to each of the three documented championship game meetings (2001, 2005 and 2006), the eventual losing team in the final defeated the eventual champion during the round robin stage of the tournament. Western Michigan, like U-M, enjoyed status on the national scene and qualified for five straight ACHA National Tournaments from 2004 through 2008. WMU took the only head-to-head meeting there however, a 6–1 decision in 2007 with both squads already eliminated from title contention.

== Players ==
=== Current roster ===
As of the 2025–26 season.

| No. | Nat. | Player | Class | Pos | Height | DoB | Hometown | Previous team |
|---|---|---|---|---|---|---|---|---|
| 1 | | Mallory Von Tersch | Junior | G | 5' 1" (1.55 m) | 2005-03-01 | Luverne, Minnesota | UW-Stevens Point (NCAA DIII) |
| 3 | | Ava Heung | Senior | F | 5' 6" (1.68 m) | 2005-01-03 | Ann Arbor, Michigan | Biggby AAA |
| 4 | | Grace Garbaty | Sophomore | F | 5' 6" (1.68 m) | 2006-01-23 | South Lyon, Michigan | Kensignton Valley |
| 5 | | Cadence Secreto | Junior | D | 5' 7" (1.7 m) | 2005-05-05 | New Windsor, New York | Union College (AAU) |
| 6 | | Salene Kalis | Freshman | F | 5' 7" (1.7 m) | 2007-05-02 | Fowlerville, Michigan | Honeybaked AAA |
| 7 | | Julia Lindahl (C) | Senior | F | 5' 7" (1.7 m) | 2004-02-23 | Plymouth, Minnesota | Wayzata HS Varsity |
| 8 | | Leanna Phillips | Freshman | D | 5' 5" (1.65 m) | 2007-07-03 | Grosse Point Woods, Michigan | Grosse Point North High |
| 10 | | Brooke Metz | Sophomore | D | 5' 11" (1.8 m) | 2006-05-05 | Shelby Township, Michigan | Little Caesars AA |
| 11 | | Keira Schaub | Junior | F | 5' 6" (1.68 m) | 2005-07-01 | St. Joseph, Michigan | Adrian College (NCAA DIII) |
| 12 | | Cara Kolwich | Senior | D | 6' 0" (1.83 m) | 2003-11-17 | Beverly Hills, Michigan | Kalkaska Stars AA |
| 13 | | Natalie Farrell | Graduate | F | 5' 10" (1.78 m) | 2002-12-24 | New Castle, Maine | Miami-Ohio (ACHA D1) |
| 15 | | Kylie Duffany | Freshman | F | 5' 7" (1.7 m) | 2007-08-07 | Livonia, Michigan | St. Mary's Prep |
| 20 | | Maddie Farris (A) | Junior | D | 5' 10" (1.78 m) | 2004-10-10 | Northville, Michigan | Honeybaked AAA |
| 21 | | Izzy DiModica | Junior | F | 5' 7" (1.7 m) | 2005-06-18 | Sudbury, Massachusetts | Dexter Southfield High |
| 25 | | Grace Bobby | Sophomore | F | 5' 4" (1.63 m) | 2005-12-25 | Livonia, Michigan | Little Caesars AA |
| 27 | | Katie Cummings (A) | Senior | F | 5' 4" (1.63 m) | 2004-12-27 | Nashville, Tennessee | Nashville Jr. Preds AA |
| 28 | | Reya Dila | Sophomore | F | 5' 3" (1.6 m) | 2005-12-24 | Ludington, Michigan | Grand Rapids Griffins AA |
| 29 | | Mariana Ceballos | Senior | F | 5' 6" (1.68 m) | 2004-05-29 | Weston, Florida | Florida Alliance AAA |
| 31 | | Avery Schiff | Senior | G | 5' 4" (1.63 m) | 2004-04-22 | Menifee, California | San Diego Angels AA |
| 32 | | Paris Heiserman | Junior | G | 5' 4" (1.63 m) | 2004-12-27 | Nashville, Tennessee | Nashville Jr Predators |
| 42 | | Emma Johns | Junior | G | 5' 7" (1.7 m) | 2005-02-01 | Grand Rapids, Michigan | GRAHA Griffins AA |
| 53 | | Rylee Noffsinger | Freshman | G | 5' 3" (1.6 m) | | Evanston, Illinois | Chicago Hawks AA |
| 54 | | Menami Gordon | Junior | F | 5' 3" (1.6 m) | 2004-12-01 | Chicago, Illinois | Madison Capitals AAA |
| 63 | | Michaela McGoff | Junior | F | 5' 6" (1.68 m) | 2005-05-18 | Washington, Michigan | Biggby AAA |
| 66 | | Samantha Carr | Junior | F | 5' 7" (1.7 m) | 2005-06-24 | Bloomfield Hills, Michigan | Little Caesars AA |
| 77 | | Emily Maliszewski (A) | Senior | F | 5' 2" (1.57 m) | 2004-05-01 | Livonia, Michigan | Little Caesars AA |

== See also ==
- American Collegiate Hockey Association
- Central Collegiate Women's Hockey Association
- Michigan Wolverines men's ice hockey
- Yost Ice Arena
- University of Michigan
