= Joel Eaves =

American basketball and football player, coach, and athletic director

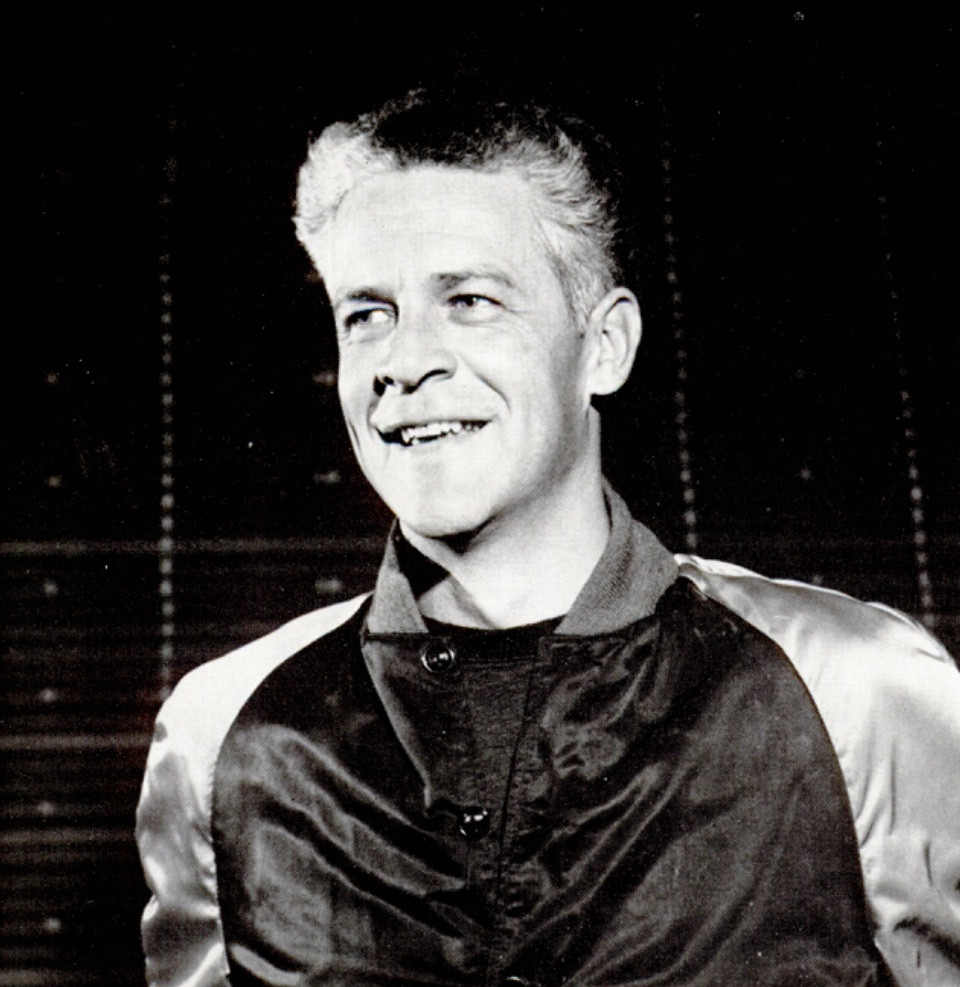
- Eaves in the 1951 Glomerata

Biographical details
- Born: June 3, 1914; Copperhill, Tennessee, U.S.
- Died: July 18, 1991 (aged 77); Athens, Georgia, U.S.

Playing career

Football
- 1934–1936: Auburn

Basketball
- 1934–1937: Auburn
- Positions: End (football); Guard (basketball)

Coaching career (HC unless noted)

Football
- 1957: Auburn (assistant)

Basketball
- 1937: Sewanee (assistant)
- 1938–1941: Sewanee
- 1949–1963: Auburn

Administrative career (AD unless noted)
- 1963–1979: Georgia

Head coaching record
- Overall: 217–143

Accomplishments and honors

Championships
- Basketball; SEC regular season (1960)

Awards
- Football; All-SEC (1936) Basketball; SEC Coach of the Year (1960); Alabama Sports Hall of Fame

Joel Harry Eaves (June 3, 1914 – July 18, 1991) was an American college football and basketball player, coach, and athletic director. He is perhaps most known for coaching basketball at his alma mater, the Auburn Tigers of Auburn University. He was also once athletic director for the Georgia Bulldogs. Eaves was inducted into the Alabama Sports Hall of Fame in 1978.

== Early years ==
Eaves was born on the Georgia state line in Copperhill, Tennessee. He grew up in Atlanta and attended Tech High School.

== Playing career ==
Eaves played on the Auburn Tigers basketball, football, and baseball teams

=== Basketball ===
Eaves was captain of the basketball team his senior year, an all-around guard. He stood 6 feet 3 inches and weighed 190 pounds. The head coach of the basketball team was Ralph "Shug" Jordan.

=== Football ===
On coach Jack Meagher's football team, Eaves was an end, selected All-SEC by the Associated Press in 1936. He was drafted in the eighth round of the 1937 NFL draft by the Boston Redskins but never played in the National Football League (NFL).

=== Baseball ===
He pitched on the college baseball team.

== Coaching career ==
=== Sewanee ===
Before coaching at Auburn, he coached the Sewanee Tigers basketball team.

=== Auburn ===
Eaves coached the Auburn men's basketball program from 1949 to 1963. He guided Auburn to its first SEC championship in 1960, and was named SEC Coach of the Year that season. Eaves made famous the shuffle offense while at Auburn. After 14 seasons at Auburn, Eaves finished with a record of 213–100 (.681).

Eaves also assisted with the football team while at Auburn, helping with the freshmen ends for two years before coaching varsity defensive ends, contributing to Auburn's 1957 national championship.

Joel Eaves was inducted into the Alabama Sports Hall of Fame in 1978. Auburn's Memorial Coliseum was renamed after Eaves to Joel H. Eaves Memorial Coliseum in 1987, and later to Beard–Eaves–Memorial Coliseum in 1993.

== Administrative career ==
Eaves was the athletic director for the Georgia Bulldogs from 1963 to 1979. He hired Vince Dooley as football coach.

== Head coaching record ==
Record table
| Season | Coach | Overall | Conference | Standing | Postseason |
|---|---|---|---|---|---|
Sewanee (Southeastern Conference) (1938–1940)
| 1938–39 | Sewanee | 1–16 | 0–13 | 13th | |
| 1939–40 | Sewanee | 2–13 | 0–9 | 13th | |
Sewanee (Independent) (1940–1941)
| 1940–41 | Sewanee | 1–14 | | | |
| Sewanee: | | 4–43 (.085) | 0–22 (.000) | | |
Auburn (Southeastern Conference) (1949–1963)
| 1949–50 | Auburn | 17–7 | 12–6 | 3rd | |
| 1950–51 | Auburn | 12–10 | 6–8 | 5th | |
| 1951–52 | Auburn | 14–12 | 6–8 | 9th | |
| 1952–53 | Auburn | 13–8 | 6–7 | 5th | |
| 1953–54 | Auburn | 16–8 | 8–6 | 5th | |
| 1954–55 | Auburn | 11–9 | 6–8 | 8th | |
| 1955–56 | Auburn | 11–10 | 8–6 | 4th | |
| 1956–57 | Auburn | 13–8 | 8–6 | 6th | |
| 1957–58 | Auburn | 16–6 | 11–3 | 2nd | |
| 1958–59 | Auburn | 20–2 | 12–2 | 2nd | |
| 1959–60 | Auburn | 19–3 | 12–2 | 1st | |
| 1960–61 | Auburn | 15–7 | 8–6 | 5th | |
| 1961–62 | Auburn | 18–6 | 11–3 | 3rd | |
| 1962–63 | Auburn | 18–4 | 10–4 | 2nd | |
| Auburn: | | 213–100 (.681) | 124–75 (.623) | | |
| Total: | | 217–143 (.603) | | | |
National champion Postseason invitational champion Conference regular season champion Conference regular season and conference tournament champion Division regular season champion Division regular season and conference tournament champion Conference tournament champion
