= 1962–63 Kansas Jayhawks men's basketball team =

American college basketball season

1962–63 Kansas Jayhawks men's basketball
- Conference: Big Eight Conference
- Record: 12–13 (5–9 Big 8)
- Head coach: Dick Harp (7th season)
- Assistant coaches: Norm Majors (1st season); Ted Owens (3rd season); Jim Stotts (1st season)
- Captain: Nolen Ellison
- Home arena: Allen Fieldhouse

1962–63 Big Eight Conference men's basketball standings
	Conf.				Overall
Team	W		L	PCT	W		L	PCT
No. 10 Colorado	11	–	3	.786	19	–	7	.731
Kansas State	11	–	3	.786	16	–	9	.640
Iowa State	8	–	6	.571	14	–	11	.560
Oklahoma	8	–	6	.571	12	–	13	.480
Oklahoma State	7	–	7	.500	16	–	9	.640
Kansas	5	–	9	.357	12	–	13	.480
Missouri	5	–	9	.357	10	–	15	.400
Nebraska	1	–	13	.071	6	–	19	.240
Rankings from AP Poll

The 1962–63 Kansas Jayhawks men's basketball team represented the University of Kansas during the 1962–63 college men's basketball season.

== Roster ==
- George Unseld
- Nolen Ellison
- Harry Gibson
- Jim Dumas
- Dave Schichtle
- Al Correll
- John Matt
- Kerry Bolton
- Dave Brill
- Loye Sparks
- Jay Roberts
- Robert Buddy Vance
- Richard Ruggles
- Jim Gough
- Pete Townsend

== Schedule ==
Date time, TV	Rank^{#}	Opponent^{#}	Result	Record	Site city, state
December 1*		Montana	W 68–56	1-0	Allen Fieldhouse; Lawrence, KS
December 3*		at Arkansas	L 62–64	1-1	Barnhill Arena; Fayetteville, AR
December 8*		at Michigan State	L 62–81	1-2	Jenison Fieldhouse; East Lansing, MI
December 10*		Wyoming	W 75–57	2-2	Allen Fieldhouse; Lawrence, KS
December 14*		vs. Arizona State	L 62–71	2-3	Ahearn Field House; Manhattan, KS
December 15*		No. 1 Cincinnati	L 49–64	2-4	Allen Fieldhouse; Lawrence, KS
December 17*		Denver	W 68–43	3-4	Allen Fieldhouse; Lawrence, KS
December 22*		at Northwestern	W 62–57	4-4	Welsh-Ryan Arena; Evanston, IL
December 26		vs. Colorado	W 70–64	5-4	Municipal Auditorium; Kansas City, MO
December 28		vs. Iowa State	W 69–51	6-4	Municipal Auditorium; Kansas City, MO
December 29		vs. Kansas State; Sunflower Showdown	W 90–88	7-4	Municipal Auditorium; Kansas City, MO
January 5		Colorado	L 57–73	7-5 (0-1)	Allen Fieldhouse; Lawrence, KS
January 12		at Iowa State	L 51–55	7-6 (0-2)	The Armory; Ames, IA
January 14		at Missouri; Border War	L 56–62	7-7 (0-3)	Brewer Fieldhouse; Columbia, MO
January 19		Nebraska	W 72–53	8-7 (1-3)	Allen Fieldhouse; Lawrence, KS
February 2		Iowa State	L 57–69	8-8 (1-4)	Allen Fieldhouse; Lawrence, KS
February 5		at Oklahoma	W 86–55	9-8 (2-4)	Field House; Norman, OK
February 9		No. 7 Colorado	L 52–62	9-9 (2-5)	Balch Fieldhouse; Boulder, CO
February 11		Oklahoma State	L 53–54	9-10 (2-6)	Allen Fieldhouse; Lawrence, KS
February 16		Oklahoma	L 62–64	9-11 (2-7)	Allen Fieldhouse; Lawrence, KS
February 19		Kansas State; Sunflower Showdown	L 54–67	9-12 (2-8)	Allen Fieldhouse; Lawrence, KS
February 23		at Nebraska	W 45–39	10-12 (3-8)	Nebraska Coliseum; Lincoln, NE
February 27		at Kansas State; Sunflower Showdown	L 60–74	10-13 (3-9)	Ahearn Field House; Manhattan, KS
March 1		Missouri; Border War	W 72–68	11-13 (4-9)	Allen Fieldhouse; Lawrence, KS
March 9		at Oklahoma State	W 49–48	12-13 (5-9)	Gallagher-Iba Arena; Stillwater, OK
*Non-conference game. ^{#}Rankings from AP Poll. (#) Tournament seedings in parentheses.
