= 1962–63 Illinois Fighting Illini men's basketball team =

American college basketball season

1962–63 Illinois Fighting Illini men's basketball

Big Ten Conference champions

NCAA Men's Division I Tournament, Elite Eight
- Conference: Big Ten Conference

Ranking
- Coaches: No. 5
- AP: No. 8
- Record: 20–6 (11–3 Big Ten)
- Head coach: Harry Combes (16th season)
- Assistant coaches: Howie Braun (26th season); Jim Wright (5th season)
- MVP: Dave Downey
- Captain: Bob Starnes
- Home arena: Huff Hall & Assembly Hall

1962–63 Big Ten Conference men's basketball standings
	Conf.				Overall
Team	W		L	PCT	W		L	PCT
No. 7 Ohio State	11	–	3	.786	20	–	4	.833
No. 8 Illinois	11	–	3	.786	20	–	6	.769
Indiana	9	–	5	.643	13	–	11	.542
Michigan	8	–	6	.571	16	–	8	.667
Minnesota	8	–	6	.571	12	–	12	.500
Wisconsin	7	–	7	.500	14	–	10	.583
Northwestern	6	–	8	.429	9	–	15	.375
Iowa	5	–	9	.357	9	–	15	.375
Michigan State	3	–	11	.214	4	–	16	.200
Purdue	2	–	12	.143	7	–	17	.292
Rankings from AP Poll

The 1962–63 Illinois Fighting Illini men's basketball team represented the University of Illiniois.

== Regular season ==
The 1962–63 season saw the Fighting Illini finish with 20–6 overall, 11–3 in the conference. Senior Dave Downey led the team in scoring, as he had the previous two seasons, and he moved into first on the all-time scoring list. Downey also set the school record for points in a game, which still stands, with 53 in a road loss to Indiana on February 16, 1963. Illinois was a game back of first place in the league standings with only two games remaining when the Assembly Hall opened its doors on March 4, 1963. Illinois’ first game at the Hall was an exciting 79–73 victory over Northwestern before 16,137 fans to stay within a game of first-place Ohio State. After Illinois edged Iowa, 73–69, in the last game of the season, the Fighting Illini would need an overtime loss two hours later by the Buckeyes at Indiana to share the title. During the season the Illini would win the Eastern College Athletic Conference Holiday Festival and make the Elite Eight of the 1963 NCAA Men's Division I Basketball Tournament, losing to eventual champion Loyola (Chicago).

=== Roster ===
1962–63 Illinois Fighting Illini men's basketball team
Players
Coaches

Pos.	#	Name	Height	Weight	Year	Previous school	Hometown
F	10	Larry Bauer	6 ft 7 in (2.01 m)	207 lb (94 kg)	So	Springfield High School	Springfield, Illinois
G	11	Bob Meadows	5 ft 7 in (1.7 m)	157 lb (71 kg)	So	Collinsville High School	Collinsville, Illinois
G	12	Tal Brody	6 ft 2 in (1.88 m)	165 lb (75 kg)	So	Central High School	Trenton, New Jersey
F	14	John Love	6 ft 3 in (1.91 m)	199 lb (90 kg)	Jr	Ottawa Township High School	Ottawa, Illinois
G	22	Jay Lovelace	6 ft 2 in (1.88 m)	164 lb (74 kg)	Sr	Carbondale Community High School	Carbondale, Illinois
C	25	Bill Burwell	6 ft 8 in (2.03 m)	227 lb (103 kg)	Sr	Boys High School	Brooklyn, New York
F	30	Jeff Ferguson	6 ft 3 in (1.91 m)	195 lb (88 kg)	Jr	Benton Consolidated High School	Benton, Illinois
G	31	Tony Latham	5 ft 11 in (1.8 m)	163 lb (74 kg)	So	Waukegan High School	Waukegan, Illinois
G	32	Bill Edwards	6 ft 3 in (1.91 m)	208 lb (94 kg)	Jr	Windsor High School	Windsor, Illinois
F	33	Bogie Redmon	6 ft 5 in (1.96 m)	218 lb (99 kg)	So	Collinsville High School	Collinsville, Illinois
G	34	Bill McKeown	6 ft 2 in (1.88 m)	185 lb (84 kg)	So	Clinton High School	Clinton, Illinois
C	35	Skip Thoren	6 ft 8 in (2.03 m)	201 lb (91 kg)	So	Rockford East High School	Rockford, Illinois
F	40	Dave Downey	6 ft 4 in (1.93 m)	204 lb (93 kg)	Sr	Canton High School	Canton, Illinois
F	44	Bob Starnes (C)	6 ft 5 in (1.96 m)	187 lb (85 kg)	Sr	Gage Park High School	Chicago, Illinois
G	53	Bill Small	6 ft 2 in (1.88 m)	185 lb (84 kg)	Sr	West Aurora High School	Aurora, Illinois

Head coach

- Harry Combes (University of Illinois) (16th year)

Assistant coach(es)

- Howie Braun (University of Illinois) (26th year)
- Jim Wright (University of Illinois) (5th year)

Legend

- (C) Team captain
- (S) Suspended
- (I) Ineligible
- (W) Walk-on
- Injured
- Current redshirt

Roster

== Schedule ==
Date time, TV	Rank^{#}	Opponent^{#}	Result	Record	Site (attendance) city, state
Non-Conference regular season
11/30/1962*	No. 8	Butler	W 66–49	1–0	Huff Hall (6,912); Champaign, IL
12/6/1962*		Washington (St. Louis)	W 99–55	2–0	Huff Hall (6,912); Champaign, IL
12/16/1962*	No. 10	at Iowa State	W 76–73	3–0	Iowa State Armory (7,000); Ames, IA
12/17/1962*	No. 10	San Jose State	W 90–64	4–0	Huff Hall (6,912); Champaign, IL
12/22/1962*	No. 8	Oklahoma	W 93–90	5–0	Huff Hall (6,000); Champaign, IL
12/26/1962*	No. 4	vs. Penn; ECAC Holiday Festival	W 98–66	6–0	Madison Square Garden (14,238); New York, NY
12/28/1962*	No. 4	at NYU; ECAC Holiday Festival	W 91–84	7–0	Madison Square Garden (15,036); New York, NY
12/29/1962*	No. 4	vs. West Virginia; ECAC Holiday Festival	W 92–74	8–0	Madison Square Garden (12,125); New York, NY
12/31/1962*	No. 3	vs. Notre Dame	L 88–90	8–1	Chicago Stadium (10,346); Chicago, IL
Big Ten regular season
1/5/1963	No. 3	at Iowa; Rivalry	W 85–76	9–1 (1–0)	Iowa Field House (12,600); Iowa City, IA
1/7/1963	No. 5	No. 5 Ohio State	W 90–78	10–1 (2–0)	Huff Hall (6,912); Champaign, IL
1/12/1963	No. 5	Purdue	W 106–82	11–1 (3–0)	Huff Hall (6,756); Champaign, IL
1/14/1963	No. 3	at Northwestern; Rivalry	W 78–76	12–1 (4–0)	McGaw Memorial Hall (7,200); Evanston, IL
1/26/1963*	No. 4	vs. No. 1 Cincinnati	L 53–62	12–2	Chicago Stadium (23,000); Chicago, IL
2/4/1963	No. 4	Indiana; Rivalry	W 104–101	13–2 (5–0)	Huff Hall (6,912); Champaign, IL
2/9/1963	No. 4	Michigan State	W 91–86	14–2 (6–0)	Huff Hall (6,797); Champaign, IL
2/11/1963	No. 4	at Wisconsin	L 77–84	14–3 (6–1)	Wisconsin Field House (12,088); Madison, WI
2/16/1963	No. 6	at Indiana; Rivalry	L 100–103	14–4 (6–2)	Gladstein Fieldhouse (10,300); Bloomington, IN
2/19/1963	No. 6	at Purdue	W 87–79	15–4 (7–2)	Lambert Fieldhouse (9,637); West Lafayette, IN
2/23/1963	No. 6	Wisconsin	W 89–77	16–4 (8–2)	Huff Hall (6,912); Champaign, IL
2/25/1963	No. 6	at Minnesota	W 81–70	17–4 (9–2)	Williams Arena (11,226); Minneapolis, MN
3/2/1963	No. 6	at Michigan	L 81–84	17–5 (9–3)	Yost Ice Arena (9,450); Ann Arbor, MI
3/4/1963	No. 8	Northwestern; Rivalry	W 79–73	18–5 (10–3)	Assembly Hall (16,137); Champaign, IL
3/9/1963	No. 8	Iowa; Rivalry	W 73–69	19–5 (11–3)	Assembly Hall (16,007); Champaign, IL
NCAA Tournament
3/15/1963*	No. 8	vs. Bowling Green; NCAA Tournament Mideast Regional Semi-Final	W 90–67	20–5	Jenison Fieldhouse (12,143); East Lansing, MI
3/16/1963*	No. 8	vs. Loyola (Chicago); NCAA Tournament Mideast Regional Final	L 64–79	20–6	Jenison Fieldhouse (9,459); East Lansing, MI
*Non-conference game. ^{#}Rankings from AP Poll. (#) Tournament seedings in parentheses. All times are in Central Time.

== Player stats ==
Player	Games played	Field goals	Free throws	Rebounds	Points
Dave Downey	26	201	111	254	513
Bill Small	26	439	81	120	439
Bill Burwell	26	158	86	230	402
Bob Starnes	26	115	84	180	314
Tal Brody	26	95	63	90	253
Skip Thoren	26	53	37	150	143
Bill Edwards	26	23	10	28	56
Bogie Redmon	23	22	11	72	55
Bill McKeown	14	4	4	12	12
John Love	8	3	2	7	8
Larry Bauer	5	2	2	6	6
Jay Lovelace	4	0	0	0	0

== Awards and honors ==
- Dave Downey
  - Helms 1st team All-American
  - Converse 2nd team All-American
  - Associated Press Honorable Mention All-American
  - Team Most Valuable Player
  - Fighting Illini All-Century team (2005)
- Bill Small
  - Converse Honorable Mention All-American
- Skip Thoren
  - Fighting Illini All-Century team (2005)

== Team players drafted into the NBA ==
Player	NBA club	Round	Pick
Bill Burwell	St. Louis Hawks	3	24
Dave Downey	San Francisco Warriors	4	30
Bill Small	Detroit Pistons	5	40
