= 1962–63 Auburn Tigers men's basketball team =

American college basketball season

1962–63 Auburn Tigers men's basketball

Sugar Bowl Tournament champions
- Conference: Southeastern Conference
- Record: 18–4 (10–4 SEC)
- Head coach: Joel Eaves (14th season)
- Captain: Layton Johns
- Home arena: Auburn Sports Arena

The 1962–63 Auburn Tigers men's basketball team represented Auburn University in the 1962–63 college basketball season. The team's head coach was Joel Eaves, who was in his fourteenth season at Auburn. The team played their home games at Auburn Sports Arena in Auburn, Alabama. They finished the season 18–4, 10–4 in SEC play.
