= 1962–63 Wisconsin Badgers men's basketball team =

American college basketball season

1962–63 Wisconsin Badgers men's basketball
- Conference: Big Ten Conference
- Record: 14–10 (7–7 Big Ten)
- Head coach: John Erickson
- Home arena: UW Fieldhouse

1962–63 Big Ten Conference men's basketball standings
	Conf.				Overall
Team	W		L	PCT	W		L	PCT
No. 7 Ohio State	11	–	3	.786	20	–	4	.833
No. 8 Illinois	11	–	3	.786	20	–	6	.769
Indiana	9	–	5	.643	13	–	11	.542
Michigan	8	–	6	.571	16	–	8	.667
Minnesota	8	–	6	.571	12	–	12	.500
Wisconsin	7	–	7	.500	14	–	10	.583
Northwestern	6	–	8	.429	9	–	15	.375
Iowa	5	–	9	.357	9	–	15	.375
Michigan State	3	–	11	.214	4	–	16	.200
Purdue	2	–	12	.143	7	–	17	.292
Rankings from AP Poll

The 1962–63 Wisconsin Badgers men's basketball team represented University of Wisconsin–Madison. The head coach was John Erickson, coaching his fourth season with the Badgers. The team played their home games at the UW Fieldhouse in Madison, Wisconsin and was a member of the Big Ten Conference.

== Schedule ==
Date time, TV	Rank^{#}	Opponent^{#}	Result	Record	Site city, state
Regular Season
12/01/1962*		at Air Force	W 72–64	1–0	Colorado Springs, CO
12/03/1962*		at Arizona	L 46–51	1–1	Men's Gymnasium; Tucson, AZ
12/08/1962*		Texas-El Paso	W 73–59	2–1	UW Fieldhouse; Madison, WI
12/10/1962*		Indiana State	L 86–87	2–2	UW Fieldhouse; Madison, WI
12/15/1962*		Miami (OH)	W 84–58	3–2	UW Fieldhouse; Madison, WI
12/19/1962*		Marquette	W 76–58	4–2	UW Fieldhouse; Madison, WI
12/22/1962*		UCLA	L 63–77	4–3	UW Fieldhouse; Madison, WI
12/28/1962*		vs. Utah; Milwaukee Classic	W 94–72	5–3	Milwaukee Arena; Milwaukee, WI
12/29/1962*		vs. Marquette; Milwaukee Classic	W 70–56	6–3	Milwaukee Arena; Milwaukee, WI
1/05/1963		at Purdue	W 74–66	7–3 (1–0)	Lambert Fieldhouse; West Lafayette, IN
1/12/1963		Michigan State	L 68–75	7–4 (1–1)	UW Fieldhouse; Madison, WI
1/14/1963		at Iowa	L 56–65	7–5 (1–2)	Iowa Field House; Iowa City, IA
1/26/1963*		St. John's (NY)	W 85–52	8–5	UW Fieldhouse; Madison, WI
2/02/1963		Minnesota	L 68–69	8–6 (1–3)	UW Fieldhouse; Madison, WI
2/04/1963		at Michigan	W 81–78	9–6 (2–3)	Yost Field House; Ann Arbor, MI
2/09/1963		at Ohio State	L 70–94	9–7 (2–4)	St. John Arena; Columbus, OH
2/11/1963		No. 4 Illinois	W 84–77	10–7 (3–4)	UW Fieldhouse; Madison, WI
2/16/1963		Northwestern	W 78–65	11–7 (4–4)	UW Fieldhouse; Madison, WI
2/18/1963		at Minnesota	L 48–72	11–8 (4–5)	Williams Arena; Minneapolis, MN
2/23/1963		at No. 6 Illinois	L 77–89	11–9 (4–6)	Huff Hall; Champaign, IL
2/25/1963		Indiana	W 102–96	12–9 (5–6)	UW Fieldhouse; Madison, WI
3/02/1963		at Michigan State	W 92–89 ^{OT}	13–9 (6–6)	Jenison Fieldhouse; East Lansing, MI
3/04/1963		Iowa	W 75–69	14–9 (7–6)	UW Fieldhouse; Madison, WI
3/09/1963		Michigan	L 80–82	14–10 (7–7)	UW Fieldhouse; Madison, WI
*Non-conference game. ^{#}Rankings from AP Poll. (#) Tournament seedings in parentheses.
