= 1962–63 Cincinnati Bearcats men's basketball team =

American college basketball season

1962–63 Cincinnati Bearcats men's basketball
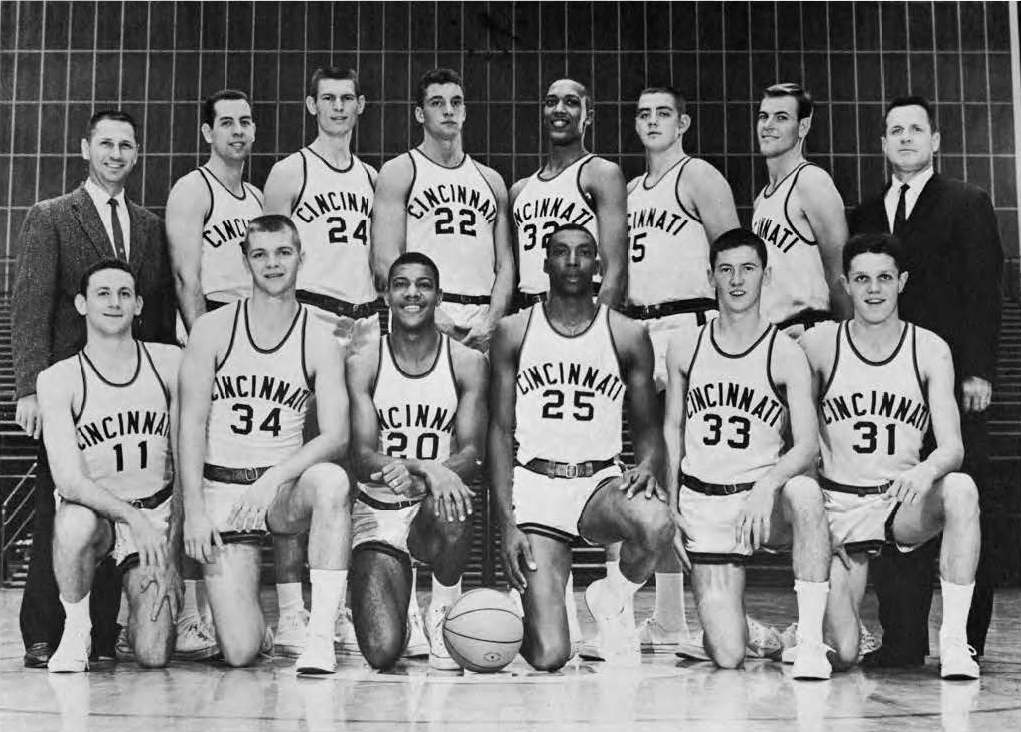

MVC champions NCAA regular season champions NCAA tournament, runner-up

National Championship Game, L 58-60 ^{OT} vs. Loyola-Chicago
- Conference: Missouri Valley Conference

Ranking
- Coaches: No. 1
- AP: No. 1
- Record: 26–2 (11–1 MVC)
- Head coach: Ed Jucker (3rd season)
- Home arena: Armory Fieldhouse

1962–63 Missouri Valley Conference men's basketball standings
	Conf.				Overall
Team	W		L	PCT	W		L	PCT
No. 1 Cincinnati	11	–	1	.917	26	–	2	.929
No. 5 Wichita Municipal	7	–	5	.583	19	–	8	.704
Bradley	6	–	6	.500	17	–	9	.654
Saint Louis	6	–	6	.500	16	–	12	.571
Tulsa	5	–	7	.417	17	–	8	.680
North Texas State	4	–	8	.333	10	–	14	.417
Drake	3	–	9	.250	11	–	14	.440
Rankings from AP Poll

The 1962–63 Cincinnati Bearcats men's basketball team represented University of Cincinnati. The team's head coach was Ed Jucker.

== Schedule ==
Date time, TV	Rank^{#}	Opponent^{#}	Result	Record	Site city, state
Regular season
December 3, 1962*	No. 1	Virginia	W 91–42	1–0	Armory Fieldhouse; Cincinnati, OH
December 5, 1962*	No. 1	Miami (OH)	W 58–36	2–0	Armory Fieldhouse; Cincinnati, OH
December 8, 1962*	No. 1	George Washington	W 86–59	3–0	Armory Fieldhouse; Cincinnati, OH
December 14, 1962*	No. 1	at Kansas State	W 75–61	4–0	Ahearn Field House; Manhattan, KS
December 15, 1962*	No. 1	at Kansas	W 64–49	5–0	Allen Fieldhouse; Lawrence, KS
December 20, 1962*	No. 1	Dayton	W 44–37	6–0	Armory Fieldhouse; Cincinnati, OH
December 22, 1962*	No. 1	Davidson	W 72–46	7–0	Armory Fieldhouse; Cincinnati, OH
December 29, 1962*	No. 1	Ohio	W 73–43	8–0	Armory Fieldhouse; Cincinnati, OH
January 2, 1963*	No. 1	Houston	W 79–56	9–0	Armory Fieldhouse; Cincinnati, OH
January 5, 1963	No. 1	No. 8 Wichita State	W 63–50	10–0	Armory Fieldhouse; Cincinnati, OH
January 10, 1963	No. 1	at North Texas	W 78–58	11–0	North Texas Men's Gym; Denton, TX
January 12, 1963	No. 1	at Tulsa	W 67–57	12–0	Expo Square Pavilion; Tulsa, OK
January 17, 1963	No. 1	at Bradley	W 52–46	13–0	Robertson Memorial Field House; Peoria, IL
January 26, 1963*	No. 1	at No. 3 Illinois	W 62–53	14–0	Huff Hall; Champaign, IL
January 31, 1963	No. 1	Drake	W 65–60	15–0	Armory Fieldhouse; Cincinnati, OH
February 2, 1963	No. 1	Saint Louis	W 70–40	16–0	Armory Fieldhouse; Cincinnati, OH
February 4, 1963	No. 1	at Drake	W 71–60	17–0	Veterans Memorial Auditorium; Des Moines, IA
February 9, 1963	No. 1	Bradley	W 65–61	18–0	Armory Fieldhouse; Cincinnati, OH
February 16, 1963	No. 1	Wichita State	L 64–65	18–1	Levitt Arena; Wichita, KS
February 21, 1963	No. 1	North Texas	W 91–61	19–1	Armory Fieldhouse; Cincinnati, OH
February 23, 1963	No. 1	Tulsa	W 55–54	20–1	Armory Fieldhouse; Cincinnati, OH
February 26, 1963*	No. 1	Xavier; Crosstown Shootout	W 72–61	21–1	Cincinnati Gardens; Cincinnati, OH
March 2, 1963	No. 1	at Saint Louis	W 66–52	22–1	Kiel Auditorium; St. Louis, MO
NCAA tournament
March 15, 1963*	No. 1	vs. Texas	W 73–68	23–1	Allen Fieldhouse; Lawrence, KS
March 16, 1963*	No. 1	vs. No. 10 Colorado	W 67–60	24–1	Allen Fieldhouse; Lawrence, KS
March 22, 1963*	No. 1	vs. Oregon State	W 80–46	25–1	Freedom Hall; Louisville, KY
March 23, 1963*	No. 1	vs. No. 3 Loyola–Chicago	L 58–60 (OT)	25–2	Freedom Hall; Louisville, KY
*Non-conference game. ^{#}Rankings from AP Poll. (#) Tournament seedings in parentheses.

== NBA draft ==
Round	Pick	Player	NBA club
1	5	Tom Thacker and Jimmy McIntosh	Cincinnati Royals
