= 1962–63 Indiana Hoosiers men's basketball team =

American college basketball season

1962–63 Indiana Hoosiers men's basketball
- Conference: Big Ten Conference
- Record: 13–11 (9–5 Big Ten)
- Head coach: Branch McCracken (22nd season)
- Assistant coaches: Lou Watson; Don Luft
- Captain: Tom Bolyard
- Home arena: New Fieldhouse

1962–63 Big Ten Conference men's basketball standings
	Conf.				Overall
Team	W		L	PCT	W		L	PCT
No. 7 Ohio State	11	–	3	.786	20	–	4	.833
No. 8 Illinois	11	–	3	.786	20	–	6	.769
Indiana	9	–	5	.643	13	–	11	.542
Michigan	8	–	6	.571	16	–	8	.667
Minnesota	8	–	6	.571	12	–	12	.500
Wisconsin	7	–	7	.500	14	–	10	.583
Northwestern	6	–	8	.429	9	–	15	.375
Iowa	5	–	9	.357	9	–	15	.375
Michigan State	3	–	11	.214	4	–	16	.200
Purdue	2	–	12	.143	7	–	17	.292
Rankings from AP Poll

The 1962–63 Indiana Hoosiers men's basketball team represented Indiana University. Their head coach was Branch McCracken, who was in his 22nd year. The team played its home games in New Fieldhouse in Bloomington, Indiana, and was a member of the Big Ten Conference.

The Hoosiers finished the regular season with an overall record of 13–11 and a conference record of 9–5, finishing 3rd in the Big Ten Conference. Indiana was not invited to participate in any postseason tournament.

== Roster ==
No.	Name	Position	Ht.	Year	Hometown
14	Gene Demaree	G	5–11	So.	New Marion, Indiana
20	Dave Granger	F	6–7	Sr.	Hillsdale, Michigan
21	Frank Daly	G	6-2	So.	Springfield, Massachusetts
22	Jimmy Rayl	G	6–2	Sr.	Kokomo, Indiana
23	Al Harden	G	5–10	So.	Covington, Indiana
25	Tom Van Arsdale	F	6–5	So.	Indianapolis, Indiana
30	Dick Van Arsdale	F	6–5	So.	Indianapolis, Indiana
31	Jim Sutton	G	5–11	Jr.	Anderson, Indiana
32	Ron Peyser	C	6–8	So.	Chicago, Illinois
33	Winston Fairfield	C	6–9	Sr.	Wilmington, Massachusetts
42	Ron Pease	F	6–3	So.	Muncie, Indiana
43	Dave Porter	F	6–4	Sr.	Noblesville, Indiana
44	Steve Redenbaugh	G	6–2	So.	Paoli, Indiana
45	Tom Bolyard	F	6–4	Sr.	Fort Wayne, Indiana
54	Jon McGlocklin	F/C	6–5	So.	Franklin, Indiana

== Schedule/results ==
Date time, TV	Rank^{#}	Opponent^{#}	Result	Record	Site city, state
Regular season
12/1/1962*		Virginia	W 90–59	1–0	New Fieldhouse; Bloomington, IN
12/3/1962*		Drake	L 76–87	1–1	New Fieldhouse; Bloomington, IN
12/8/1962*	No. 8	Iowa State	L 55–63	1–2	New Fieldhouse; Bloomington, IN
12/10/1962*	No. 8	at Missouri	L 51–52	1–3	Brewer Fieldhouse; Columbia, MO
12/15/1962*		North Carolina	W 90–76	2–3	New Fieldhouse; Bloomington, IN
12/17/1962*		at Detroit	W 92–84	3–3	Calihan Hall; Detroit, MI
12/19/1962*		at No. 4 Loyola (Chicago)	L 94–106	3–4	New Fieldhouse; Bloomington, IN
12/21/1962*		at Kansas State	L 72–88	3–5	Ahearn Field House; Manhattan, KS
1/2/1963*		vs. Notre Dame	L 70–73	3–6	Memorial Coliseum; Fort Wayne, IN
1/5/1963		at Michigan State	W 96–84	4–6 (1–0)	Jenison Fieldhouse; East Lansing, MI
1/7/1963		Purdue; Rivalry	W 85–71	5–6 (2–0)	New Fieldhouse; Bloomington, IN
1/26/1963*		DePaul	W 76–75	6–6 (2–0)	New Fieldhouse; Bloomington, IN
1/28/1963		at Purdue; Rivalry	W 74–73	7–6 (3–0)	Lambert Fieldhouse; West Lafayette, IN
2/2/1963		Northwestern	L 87–100	7–7 (3–1)	New Fieldhouse; Bloomington, IN
2/4/1963		at No. 4 Illinois; Rivalry	L 101–104	7–8 (3–2)	Huff Hall; Champaign, IL
2/9/1963		at Michigan	L 86–90	7–9 (3–3)	Yost Field House; Ann Arbor, MI
2/11/1963		Minnesota	W 89–77	8–9 (4–3)	New Fieldhouse; Bloomington, IN
2/16/1963		No. 4 Illinois; Rivalry	W 103–100	9–9 (5–3)	New Fieldhouse; Bloomington, IN
2/18/1963		at Iowa	W 82–80	10–9 (6–3)	Iowa Field House; Iowa City, IA
2/23/1963		Michigan State	W 113–94	11–9 (7–3)	New Fieldhouse; Bloomington, IN
2/25/1963		at Wisconsin	L 96–102	11–10 (7–4)	Wisconsin Field House; Madison, WI
3/2/1963		at Minnesota	L 73–105	11–11 (7–5)	Williams Arena; Minneapolis, MN
3/4/1963		Michigan	W 104–96	12–11 (8–5)	New Fieldhouse; Bloomington, IN
3/9/1963		No. 3 Ohio State	W 87–85 ^{OT}	13–11 (9–5)	New Fieldhouse; Bloomington, IN
*Non-conference game. ^{#}Rankings from AP Poll. (#) Tournament seedings in parentheses.
