= Yost Ice Arena =

Hockey arena in Ann Arbor, Michigan

- The Cathedral of College Hockey
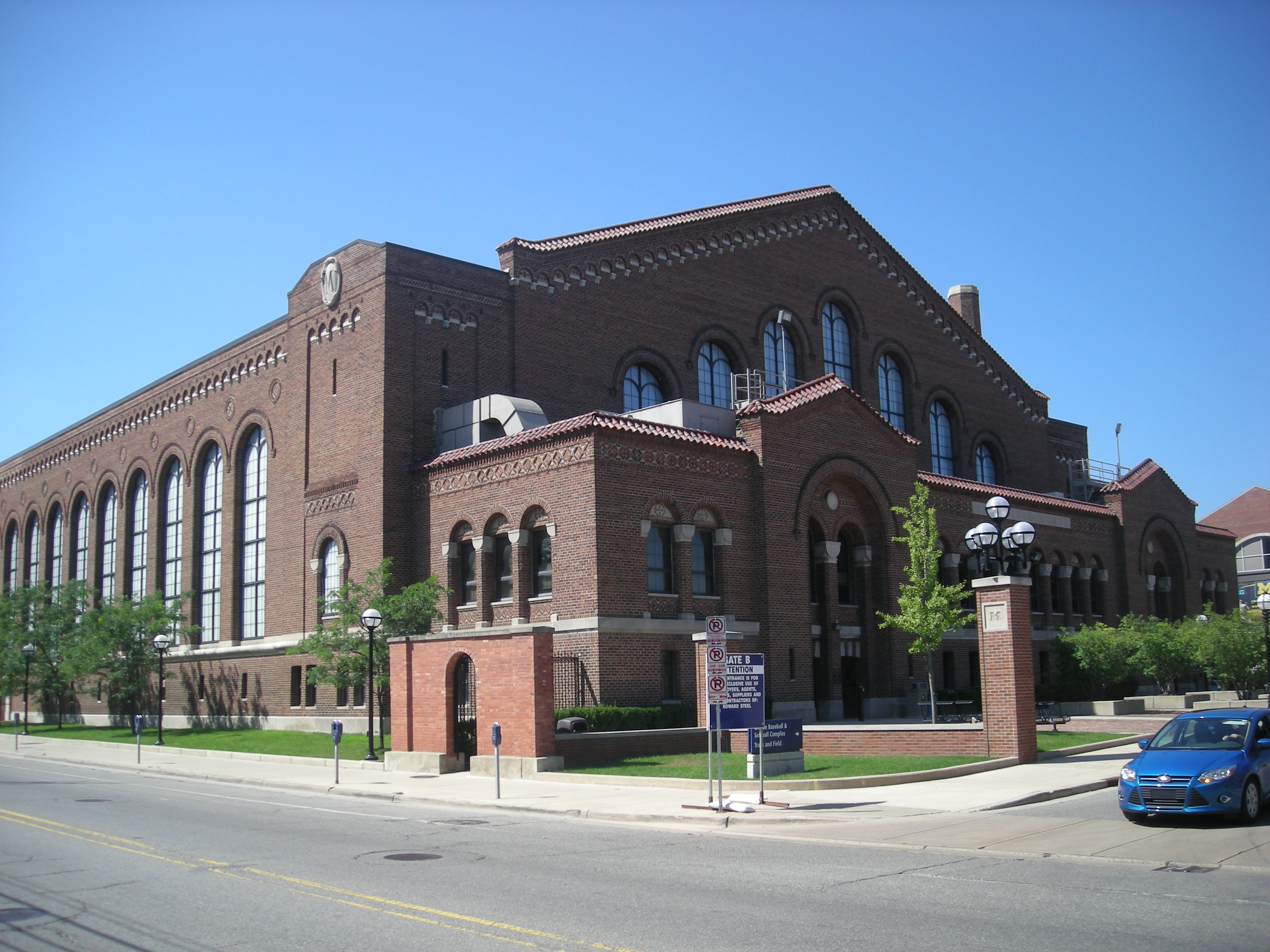
- Interactive map of Yost Ice Arena
- Former names: Fielding H. Yost Field House (1924–1973)
- Location: 1000 S State St; Ann Arbor, MI 48109
- Coordinates: 42°16′4″N 83°44′27.7″W
- Owner: University of Michigan
- Operator: University of Michigan
- Capacity: 8,100 (1973–1991); 7,235 (1991–1996); 6,343 (1996–2001); 6,637 (2001–2012); 5,800 (2012–present)
- Surface: Ice
- Record attendance: 8,411
- Field size: 200 ft × 85 ft (61 m × 26 m) (ice hockey); 2 ft × 100 ft × 100 ft (0.61 m × 30.48 m × 30.48 m) (ice hockey)

Construction
- Groundbreaking: January 1922
- Opened: November 10, 1923 (102 years ago)
- Cost: $563,168 (original) $9.9 million (combined renovations of 1992, 1996, 2001 & 2006) $16 million (2012 renovation)
- Architects: Charles R. Beltz and Company; Rossetti (2012 renovation)

Tenants
- Michigan Wolverines (NCAA); Men's basketball 1923–1967; Men's ice hockey 1973–present Women's ice hockey (ACHA) 1994–present

Yost Ice Arena, formerly the Fielding H. Yost Field House, is an indoor ice hockey arena located on the campus of the University of Michigan in Ann Arbor. It is the home of the Michigan men's ice hockey team.

Yost Field House opened in 1923 and was the home of the Michigan men's basketball team until the Crisler Center opened in 1967. It was converted into an ice arena in 1973 and has been home of the men's ice hockey team since then. It also has been the home of Michigan's women's ice hockey club team since its establishment in 1994.

== History ==
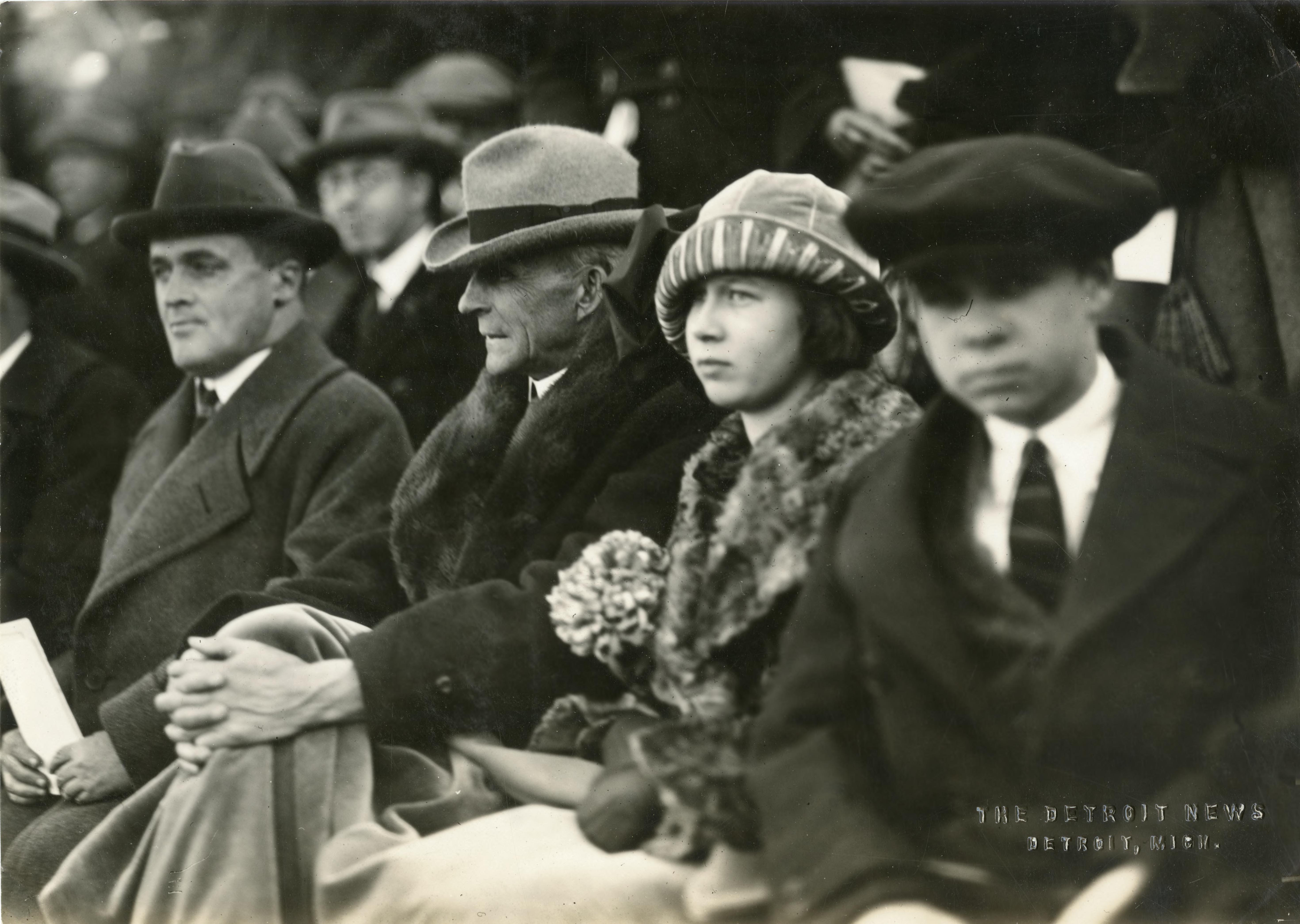
Henry Ford (second from the left) at the dedication of Yost Field House in 1923

Built in 1923 as a field house, the facility is named in honor of Michigan's longtime football coach and athletic director, Fielding H. Yost. For many years, it housed the men's basketball team until it relocated to the larger Crisler Arena in 1967. It also housed the track teams until 1973. In 1973, it was converted into an ice arena, replacing the outdated Michigan Coliseum, and the Michigan hockey team has used it since. The University of Michigan's Senior and Collegiate synchronized skating and freestyle teams also practice at Yost. In addition, local high school teams, recreational leagues (AAAHA) and the university's intramural hockey league call it home.

Yost both conceived and oversaw the building of U of M's athletic campus. It includes the Michigan Stadium and Yost Field House. "The Field House was named for Yost in 1923 based in part on a Michigan Daily-led campaign."

Yost Ice Arena has hosted NCAA Ice Hockey Tournament games five times in its history, most recently in 2003. In 2017, the rink at Yost was named the Red Berenson Rink after former coach Red Berenson in honor of his 33 seasons of coaching Michigan's ice hockey team, and officially dedicated to Berenson on January 5, 2018.

The Yost Ice Arena was named in his honor. In 2021, there were calls to remove his name; and "The President’s Advisory Committee on University History is accepting input on the plan until June 7." The university historians who considered the proposal opined: "It determined that Yost's contributions to UM football and athletics were inequitably placed above the “profoundly deep and negative impact he had on people of color.” (Note: While athletic director "Yost was instrumental in benching African American football star Willis Ward because Georgia Tech refused to play Michigan at home if an African American was allowed to play. That decision was a factor in the committee's decision to recommend changing the arena's name.") Removal of honorific names from buildings at the University of Michigan must be approved by the Board of Regents.

== Renovations ==
Yost has undergone a number of renovations to modernize its facilities and improve amenities for spectators. In 1992, a $1 million renovation project replaced the rink floor and refrigeration unit and included the installation of a desiccant dehumidification system. A $5.5 million renovation project completed prior to the 1996–97 season brought new dasherboards with tempered glass, improved lighting and sound systems, state-of-the art ceiling insulation, and the replacement of end zone scoreboards with fully automated boards on the east and west sides. First floor remodeling included a new pro shop, modernized concession stands and restrooms, new locker rooms and an improved lobby, complete with trophy showcases and ornate woodwork. Seating throughout the venue was reconfigured and sight lines were improved.

The facility underwent another $1.4 million renovations during the summer of 2001, which created a new balcony directly across from the press box that juts out over existing stands and provides 300 new seats. In the entrance to the new seating level is a lounge that opens up onto a platform in the northeast corner on the arena and overlooks the ice. A new stairwell, new restrooms and a kitchen to serve hot food in the new seating area also were added to improve the amenities for the individuals sitting in the new seats. In addition, a center ice scoreboard and monitors underneath the east and west wing balconies were installed. In the summer of 2006, a $2 million project involved the building of a new opponent locker room. It is situated at the opposite end of the ice from U-M's locker room, making entering and exiting the ice easier for both teams.

The most recent renovation cost the University of Michigan Athletics Department $16 million and was done by Rossetti Architects. The renovation began in the spring of 2012 and was completed in September. The renovation included: ADA accessible seating, new aluminum bench seating throughout, "ice" box seats in the corners of the arena, seat backed premium seating, a new press box, a redesigned concourse with improved concessions, exterior windows and updated lighting and sound systems. These upgrades followed the installation of a new HD video board installed in 2011. Yost Ice Arena's seating was reduced from 6,200 to 5,800, though premium seating was expanded from 300 to 500 and total capacity is approximately 6,600.

The Michigan hockey team held a re-dedication ceremony for the newly renovated Yost Ice Arena on November 16, 2012, at their game against Notre Dame. Nearly 80 former players joined the Michigan faithful that night, including Marty Turco and Brendan Morrison. The group took to the ice during the first intermission, where they cut pieces from a net using oversized scissors, while a packed house waved glowsticks.

== Statistics ==
Yost Ice Arena: (1973–present)

- Capacity: 8,100 (1973–74 to 1990–91); 7,235 (1991–92 to 1995–96); 6,343 (1996–97 to 2000–01); 6,637 (2001–02 to 2011–12); 5,800 (2012–13 to present)
- Constructed: 1923
- Dedicated: November 10, 1923
- Renovated: 1973, 1992, 1996, 2001, 2006, 2012
- Name Changes: Fielding H. Yost Field House (1924–73), Yost Ice Arena (1973–present)
- First Ice Hockey Game: Nov. 2, 1973, a 6–2 U-M win over Waterloo Lutheran

Top single-game crowds

- 8,411 vs Michigan State: Jan. 29, 1988
- 8,404 vs Michigan State: Feb. 18, 1989
- 8,396 vs Michigan State: Feb. 17, 1990

Top weekend series crowds

- 19,114 vs Cornell: Mar. 15–17, 1991
- 15,528 vs Michigan Tech: Feb. 27–28, 1981
- 15,240 vs Lake Superior: Jan. 31–Feb. 1, 1992

Top single-game post-renovation crowds (1996–97 to present)

- 6,986 vs Michigan State: January 19, 2002
- 6,984 vs Notre Dame: January 18, 2008
- 6,983 vs Notre Dame: January 31, 2009
