= 1961–62 Kansas Jayhawks men's basketball team =

American college basketball season

1961–62 Kansas Jayhawks men's basketball
- Conference: Big Eight Conference
- Record: 7–18 (3–11 Big Eight)
- Head coach: Dick Harp (6th season)
- Assistant coaches: Jim Husser (1st season); Dee Ketchum (1st season); Ted Owens (2nd season)
- Home arena: Allen Fieldhouse

1961–62 Big Eight Conference men's basketball standings
	Conf.				Overall
Team	W		L	PCT	W		L	PCT
No. 9 Colorado	13	–	1	.929	19	–	7	.731
No. 6 Kansas State	12	–	2	.857	22	–	3	.880
Iowa State	8	–	6	.571	13	–	12	.520
Oklahoma State	7	–	7	.500	14	–	11	.560
Nebraska	5	–	9	.357	9	–	16	.360
Oklahoma	5	–	9	.357	7	–	17	.292
Missouri	3	–	11	.214	9	–	16	.360
Kansas	3	–	11	.214	7	–	18	.280
Rankings from AP Poll

The 1961–62 Kansas Jayhawks men's basketball team represented the University of Kansas during the 1961–62 college men's basketball season. The Jayhawks were coached by Dick Harp in his 6th season with the program. The Jayhawks, members of the Big Eight Conference, played their home games at Allen Fieldhouse. The Jayhawks' 7 wins remains the fewest wins in program history in a season in which they played more than 20 games.

== Roster ==
- Jerry Gardner
- Nolen Ellison
- Jim Dumas
- Harry Gibson
- Loye Sparks
- John Matt
- Robert Buddy Vance
- Lee Flachsbarth
- Jay Roberts
- Carl Deane
- Derrill Gwinner
- Pete Townsend

== Schedule ==
Date time, TV	Rank^{#}	Opponent^{#}	Result	Record	Site city, state
December 1*		Arkansas	W 85–74	1-0	Allen Fieldhouse; Lawrence, KS
December 4*		Saint Louis	L 65–79	1-1	Allen Fieldhouse; Lawrence, KS
December 8*		at No. 4 USC	L 70–78	1-2	L.A. Sports Arena; Los Angeles, CA
December 9*		at UCLA	L 61–69	1-3	L.A. Sports Arena; Los Angeles, CA
December 11*		at Arizona State	L 58–72	1-4	Sun Devil Gym; Tempe, AZ
December 15*		No. 9 St. John's	L 59–64	1-5	Allen Fieldhouse; Lawrence, KS
December 16*		vs. Marquette	W 76–62	2-5	Ahearn Field House; Manhattan, KS
December 28*		vs. Oklahoma	L 60–61	2-6	Municipal Auditorium; Kansas City, MO
December 29		vs. Colorado	W 75–66	3-6	Municipal Auditorium; Kansas City, MO
December 30		vs. Nebraska	W 69–68	4-6	Municipal Auditorium; Kansas City, MO
January 6		Nebraska	L 69–68	4-7 (0-1)	Allen Fieldhouse; Lawrence, KS
January 10		at No. 5 Kansas State; Sunflower Showdown	L 45–70	4-8 (0-2)	Ahearn Field House; Manhattan, KS
January 13		at Missouri; Border War	W 65–54	5-8 (1-2)	Brewer Fieldhouse; Columbia, MO
February 3*		at Air Force	L 72–76	5-9	Cadet Gymnasium; Colorado Springs, CO
February 5		Missouri; Border War	L 66–79	5-10 (1-3)	Allen Fieldhouse; Lawrence, KS
February 7		No. 4 Kansas State; Sunflower Showdown	L 72–91	5-11 (1-4)	Allen Fieldhouse; Lawrence, KS
February 10		Iowa State	L 72–75	5-12 (1-5)	Allen Fieldhouse; Lawrence, KS
February 12		at Oklahoma State	L 68–72	5-13 (1-6)	Gallagher-Iba Arena; Stillwater, OK
February 17		Colorado	L 61–65	5-14 (1-7)	Allen Fieldhouse; Lawrence, KS
February 19		Oklahoma	L 66–67 ^{OT}	5-15 (1-8)	Allen Fieldhouse; Lawrence, KS
February 21		at Nebraska	W 73–70	6-15 (2-8)	Nebraska Coliseum; Lincoln, NE
February 24		Oklahoma State	L 37–56	6-16 (2-9)	Allen Fieldhouse; Lawrence, KS
February 28		at Oklahoma	L 62–63	6-17 (2-10)	Field House; Norman, OK
March 5		at Iowa State	W 76–71	7-17 (3-10)	The Armory; Ames, IA
March 10		at Colorado	L 59–63	7-18 (3-11)	Balch Fieldhouse; Boulder, CO
*Non-conference game. ^{#}Rankings from AP Poll. (#) Tournament seedings in parentheses.
