= 1963–64 Kansas Jayhawks men's basketball team =

American college basketball season

1963–64 Kansas Jayhawks men's basketball
- Conference: Big Eight Conference
- Record: 13–12 (8–6 Big 8)
- Head coach: Dick Harp (8th season)
- Assistant coaches: Bob Frederick (1st season); Ted Owens (4th season)
- Captains: Al Correll; Harry Gibson
- Home arena: Allen Fieldhouse

1963–64 Big Eight Conference men's basketball standings
	Conf.				Overall
Team	W		L	PCT	W		L	PCT
Kansas State	12	–	2	.857	22	–	7	.759
Colorado	9	–	5	.643	15	–	10	.600
Kansas	8	–	6	.571	13	–	12	.520
Oklahoma State	7	–	7	.500	15	–	10	.600
Missouri	7	–	7	.500	13	–	11	.542
Iowa State	5	–	9	.357	9	–	16	.360
Nebraska	5	–	9	.357	7	–	18	.280
Oklahoma	3	–	11	.214	7	–	18	.280
Rankings from AP Poll

The 1963–64 Kansas Jayhawks men's basketball team represented the University of Kansas during the 1963–64 college men's basketball season.

== Roster ==
- George Unseld
- Steve Renko
- Harry Gibson
- Walt Wesley
- Al Correll
- Dave Schichtle
- Del Lewis
- Riney Lochmann
- Robert Buddy Vance
- Wayne Loving
- Dave Brill
- Fred Chana
- Kerry Bolton
- Jim Gough
- Richard Ruggles
- Jay Roberts
- Sherman Stimley

== Schedule ==
Date time, TV	Rank^{#}	Opponent^{#}	Result	Record	Site city, state
December 4*	No. 18	Arkansas	W 73–60	1-0	Allen Fieldhouse; Lawrence, KS
December 7*		at No. 3 Cincinnati	W 51–47	2-0	Armory Fieldhouse; Cincinnati, OH
December 10*	No. 10	Texas Tech	W 73–67	3-0	Allen Fieldhouse; Lawrence, KS
December 13*	No. 10	USC	W 60–52	4-0	Allen Fieldhouse; Lawrence, KS
December 14*	No. 10	at UCLA	L 54–74	4-1	Ahearn Field House; Manhattan, KS
December 19*		at New Mexico	L 54–59	4-2	Johnson Center; Albuquerque, NM
December 21*		at San Francisco	L 58–75	4-3	War Memorial Gymnasium; San Francisco, CA
December 23*		at Stanford	L 64–69	4-4	Old Pavilion; Stanford, CA
December 27		vs. Colorado	W 74–67	5-4	Municipal Auditorium; Kansas City, MO
December 28		vs. Oklahoma State	L 56–65	5-5	Municipal Auditorium; Kansas City, MO
December 30		vs. Missouri; Border War	L 61–63	5-6	Municipal Auditorium; Kansas City, MO
January 4		at Oklahoma	L 63–65	5-7 (0-1)	Field House; Norman, OK
January 6		at Oklahoma State	L 48–64	5-8 (0-2)	Gallagher-Iba Arena; Stillwater, OK
January 11		at Colorado	W 73–55	6-8 (1-2)	Balch Fieldhouse; Boulder, CO
January 14		Nebraska	W 74–48	7-8 (2-2)	Allen Fieldhouse; Lawrence, KS
January 18		Iowa State	W 74–51	8-8 (3-2)	Allen Fieldhouse; Lawrence, KS
February 1		at Kansas State; Sunflower Showdown	L 55–58	8-9 (3-3)	Ahearn Field House; Manhattan, KS
February 4		Missouri; Border War	L 58–59	8-10 (3-4)	Allen Fieldhouse; Lawrence, KS
February 8		at Iowa State	W 67–65	9-10 (4-4)	The Armory; Ames, IA
February 15		Oklahoma	W 84–72	10-10 (5-4)	Allen Fieldhouse; Norman, OK
February 17		at Missouri; Border War	L 60–68	10-11 (5-5)	Brewer Fieldhouse; Columbia, MO
February 22		Kansas State; Sunflower showdown	L 46–70	10-12 (5-6)	Allen Fieldhouse; Lawrence, KS
February 24		at Nebraska	W 64–55	11-12 (6-6)	Nebraska Coliseum; Lincoln, NE
March 2		Colorado	W 73–71	12-12 (7-6)	Allen Fieldhouse; Lawrence, KS
March 7		Oklahoma State	W 58–46	13-12 (8-6)	Allen Fieldhouse; Lawrence, KS
*Non-conference game. ^{#}Rankings from AP Poll. (#) Tournament seedings in parentheses.
