= 1960–61 Kansas Jayhawks men's basketball team =

American college basketball season

1960–61 Kansas Jayhawks men's basketball
- Conference: Big Eight Conference
- Record: 17–8 (10–4 Big 8)
- Head coach: Dick Harp (5th season)
- Assistant coaches: Lew Johnson (1st season); Ted Owens (1st season)
- Captains: Bill Bridges; Dee Ketchum
- Home arena: Allen Fieldhouse

1960–61 Big Eight Conference men's basketball standings
	Conf.				Overall
Team	W		L	PCT	W		L	PCT
No. 4 Kansas State	12	–	2	.857	22	–	5	.815
Kansas	10	–	4	.714	17	–	8	.680
Oklahoma State	8	–	6	.571	14	–	11	.560
Missouri	7	–	7	.500	11	–	13	.458
Iowa State	6	–	8	.429	14	–	11	.560
Nebraska	4	–	10	.286	10	–	14	.417
Oklahoma	2	–	12	.143	10	–	15	.400
Colorado	7	–	7	.500	15	–	10	.600
Rankings from AP Poll

The 1960–61 Kansas Jayhawks men's basketball team represented the University of Kansas during the 1960–61 college men's basketball season.

== Roster ==
- Wayne Hightower
- Bill Bridges
- Jerry Gardner
- Nolen Ellison
- Al Correll
- Dee Ketchum
- Butch Ellison
- Ralph Heyward
- Jim Dumas
- Carl Deane
- John Matt
- Grover Marshall
- Pete Woodward
- John Williams
- Bob Frederick
- Larry Sterlin

== Schedule ==
Date time, TV	Rank^{#}	Opponent^{#}	Result	Record	Site city, state
December 1*		Northwestern	W 86–69	1-0	Allen Fieldhouse; Lawrence, KS
December 5*		at Texas Tech	W 97–75	2-0	Lubbock Municipal Coliseum; Lubbock, TX
December 9*		at St. John's	L 54–66	2-1	Madison Square Garden (III); New York, NY
December 16*	No. 16	vs. Michigan State	W 93–69	3-1	Ahearn Field House; Manhattan, KS
December 17*	No. 16	No. 5 North Carolina	L 70–78	3-2	Allen Fieldhouse; Lawrence, KS
December 20*	No. 20	at BYU	L 70–80	3-3	George Albert Smith Field House; Provo, UT
December 22*	No. 20	at San Francisco	W 60–43	4-3	War Memorial Gymnasium; San Francisco, CA
December 27		vs. Nebraska	W 78–53	5-3	Municipal Auditorium; Kansas City, MO
December 28		vs. Iowa State	W 76–72	6-3	Municipal Auditorium; Kansas City, MO
December 29		vs. No. 12 Kansas State; Sunflower Showdown	L 66–69	6-4	Municipal Auditorium; Kansas City, MO
January 7		at Oklahoma	W 58–55	7-4 (1-0)	Field House; Norman, OK
January 9		at Oklahoma State	W 73–68	8-4 (2-0)	Gallagher-Iba Arena; Stillwater, OK
January 14		Iowa State	W 90–59	9-4 (3-0)	Allen Fieldhouse; Lawrence, KS
January 16		Oklahoma State	L 49–54	9-5 (3-1)	Allen Fieldhouse; Lawrence, KS
January 20		No. 10 Kansas State; Sunflower Showdown	W 75–66	10-5 (4-1)	Allen Fieldhouse; Lawrence, KS
February 4		Air Force	W 78–52	11-5	Allen Fieldhouse; Lawrence, KS
February 6		Colorado	W 88–65	12-5 (5-1)	Allen Fieldhouse; Lawrence, KS
February 11		at Nebraska	W 38–33	13-5 (6-1)	Nebraska Coliseum; Lincoln, NE
February 13		Missouri; Border War	W 88–73	14-5 (7-1)	Allen Fieldhouse; Lawrence, KS
February 18		at Colorado	W 90–62	15-5 (8-1)	Balch Fieldhouse; Boulder, CO
February 21		at No. 8 Kansas State; Sunflower Showdown	L 63–81	15-6 (8-2)	Ahearn Field House; Manhattan, KS
February 25		Nebraska	W 68–69	15-7 (8-3)	Allen Fieldhouse; Lawrence, KS
February 28		Oklahoma	W 81–56	16-7 (9-3)	Allen Fieldhouse; Lawrence, KS
March 6		at Iowa State	W 85–75	17-7 (10-3)	The Armory; Ames, IA
March 11		at Missouri; Border War	L 76–79	17-8 (10-4)	Brewer Fieldhouse; Columbia, MO
*Non-conference game. ^{#}Rankings from AP Poll. (#) Tournament seedings in parentheses.
