= 1965–66 Iowa State Cyclones men's basketball team =

American college basketball season

1965–66 Iowa State Cyclones men's basketball
- Conference: Big Eight Conference
- Record: 11–14 (6–8 Big Eight)
- Head coach: Glen Anderson (7th season)
- Assistant coach: Bob Lamson
- Home arena: Iowa State Armory

1965–66 Big Eight Conference men's basketball standings
	Conf.				Overall
Team	W		L	PCT	W		L	PCT
No. 4 Kansas	13	–	1	.929	23	–	4	.852
Nebraska	12	–	2	.857	20	–	5	.800
Kansas State	9	–	5	.643	14	–	11	.560
Oklahoma	7	–	7	.500	11	–	14	.440
Colorado	6	–	8	.429	12	–	13	.480
Iowa State	6	–	8	.429	11	–	14	.440
Oklahoma State	2	–	12	.143	4	–	21	.160
Missouri	1	–	13	.071	3	–	21	.125
Rankings from AP Poll

The 1965–66 Iowa State Cyclones men's basketball team represented Iowa State University during the 1965–66 NCAA Division I men's basketball season. The Cyclones were coached by Glen Anderson, who was in his seventh season with the Cyclones. They played their home games at the Iowa State Armory in Ames, Iowa.

They finished the season 11–14, 6–8 in Big Eight play to finish in a tie for fifth place.

== Roster ==
1965–66 Iowa State Cyclones men's basketball team
Players
Coaches

Pos.	#	Name	Height	Weight	Year	Hometown
C		Jerry Closter	6 ft 7 in (2.01 m)	—	Sr
		Ron Doncagave	—	—
F		Raul Duarte	6 ft 9 in (2.06 m)	—	Jr	Lima, Peru
C		Dave Fleming	6 ft 5 in (1.96 m)	—	Jr	Cedar Falls, Iowa
		David Harvey	6 ft 4 in (1.93 m)	—	Jr	Goldfield, Iowa
		Gene Hoemann	—	—
F		Gary Jones	6 ft 4 in (1.93 m)	—	Sr
F		Al Koch (C)	—	—	Sr
G		John McGonigle	6 ft 3 in (1.91 m)	—	So	Moline, Illinois
F		Don Smith	6 ft 8 in (2.03 m)	—	So	Brooklyn, New York
		Wayne Tjernagel	—	—		Nevada, Iowa
G		Al Tubbs	6 ft 1 in (1.85 m)	—	Sr
F		Al Wantiez	—	—	Sr
G		Bob Ziegler (C)	6 ft 3 in (1.91 m)	—	Sr
G		Don Ziegler	6 ft 2 in (1.88 m)	—	Jr	Laurens, Iowa

Head coach

- Glen Anderson

Assistant coach(es)

Bob Lamson

Legend

- (C) Team captain
- (S) Suspended
- (I) Ineligible
- (W) Walk-on
- Injured
- Current redshirt

== Schedule and results ==
Date time, TV	Rank^{#}	Opponent^{#}	Result	Record	Site city, state
Regular season
December 1, 1965*; 7:35 pm		Air Force	W 59–55	1–0	Iowa State Armory; Ames, Iowa
December 4, 1965*; 8:00 pm		at No. 7 Minnesota	L 69–80	1–1	Williams Arena; Minneapolis, Minnesota
December 6, 1965*; 7:35 pm		New Mexico	L 52–56	1–2	Iowa State Armory; Ames, Iowa
December 11, 1965*; 7:35 pm		at Augustana	W 102–76	2–2	Sioux Falls Arena; Sioux Falls, South Dakota
December 13, 1965*; 7:35 pm		State College of Iowa (Northern Iowa); Iowa Big Four	W 73–54	3–2	Iowa State Armory; Ames, Iowa
December 16, 1965*; 8:00 pm		at Drake; Iowa Big Four	L 66–72	3–3	Veterans Memorial Auditorium; Des Moines, Iowa
December 20, 1965*; 7:30 pm		at Ohio State	L 70–87	3–4	St. John Arena; Columbus, Ohio
December 28, 1965*; 7:35 pm		vs. Colorado; Big Eight Holiday Tournament Quarterfinals	W 89–72	4–4	Municipal Auditorium (10,500); Kansas City, Missouri
December 29, 1965*; 9:30 pm		vs. Kansas; Big Eight Holiday Tournament Semifinals	L 66–73	4–5	Municipal Auditorium; Kansas City, Missouri
December 30, 1965*; 3:00 pm		vs. Oklahoma; Big Eight Holiday Tournament Third Place	W 87–82	5–5	Municipal Auditorium; Kansas City, Missouri
January 4, 1966; 7:35 pm		Nebraska	L 74–76	5–6 (0–1)	Iowa State Armory; Ames, Iowa
January 8, 1966; 8:00 pm		at Kansas	L 65–82	5–7 (0–2)	Allen Fieldhouse; Lawrence, Kansas
January 10, 1966; 7:35 pm		Missouri	W 85–70	6–7 (1–2)	Iowa State Armory; Ames, Iowa
January 15, 1966; 7:35 pm		No. 10 Kansas	L 47–49	6–8 (1–3)	Iowa State Armory; Ames, Iowa
January 17, 1966; 9:05 pm		at Colorado	L 63–71	6–9 (1–4)	Balch Fieldhouse; Boulder, Colorado
January 22, 1966; 7:35 pm		Oklahoma State	W 76–61	7–9 (2–4)	Iowa State Armory; Ames, Iowa
January 26, 1966*; 7:35 pm		Drake; Iowa Big Four	L 71–74	7–10	Iowa State Armory; Ames, Iowa
January 29, 1966; 7:35 pm		at Oklahoma State	W 69–56	8–10 (3–4)	Gallagher Hall; Stillwater, Oklahoma
January 31, 1966; 8:05 pm		at Oklahoma	W 92–82	9–10 (4–4)	OU Fieldhouse; Norman, Oklahoma
February 5, 1966; 7:35 pm		Colorado	W 74–65	10–10 (5–4)	Iowa State Armory; Ames, Iowa
February 12, 1966; 7:30 pm		at No. 9 Nebraska	L 70–81	10–11 (5–5)	Nebraska Coliseum; Lincoln, Nebraska
February 14, 1966; 7:30 pm		at Kansas State	L 69–80	10–12 (5–6)	Ahearn Fieldhouse; Manhattan, Kansas
February 19, 1966; 7:35 pm		Oklahoma	L 78–80	10–13 (5–7)	Iowa State Armory; Ames, Iowa
March 3, 1966; 7:35 pm		at Missouri	W 79–73	11–13 (6–7)	Brewer Fieldhouse; Columbia, Missouri
March 7, 1966; 7:35 pm		Kansas State	L 73–75 ^{OT}	11–14 (6–8)	Iowa State Armory; Ames, Iowa
*Non-conference game. ^{#}Rankings from AP poll. (#) Tournament seedings in parentheses. All times are in Central Time.
