= 1963–64 Iowa State Cyclones men's basketball team =

American college basketball season

1963–64 Iowa State Cyclones men's basketball
- Conference: Big Eight Conference
- Record: 10–16 (5–9 Big Eight)
- Head coach: Glen Anderson (5th season)
- Home arena: Iowa State Armory

1963–64 Big Eight Conference men's basketball standings
	Conf.				Overall
Team	W		L	PCT	W		L	PCT
Kansas State	12	–	2	.857	22	–	7	.759
Colorado	9	–	5	.643	15	–	10	.600
Kansas	8	–	6	.571	13	–	12	.520
Oklahoma State	7	–	7	.500	15	–	10	.600
Missouri	7	–	7	.500	13	–	11	.542
Iowa State	5	–	9	.357	9	–	16	.360
Nebraska	5	–	9	.357	7	–	18	.280
Oklahoma	3	–	11	.214	7	–	18	.280
Rankings from AP Poll

The 1963–64 Iowa State Cyclones men's basketball team represented Iowa State University during the 1963–64 NCAA Division I men's basketball season. The Cyclones were coached by Glen Anderson, who was in his fifth season with the Cyclones. They played their home games at the Iowa State Armory in Ames, Iowa.

They finished the season 10–16, 5–9 in Big Eight play to finish tied for sixth place.

== Roster ==
1963–64 Iowa State Cyclones men's basketball team
Players
Coaches

Pos.	#	Name	Height	Weight	Year	Hometown
C		Jerry Closter	6 ft 7 in (2.01 m)	—	So	Creighton, Nebraska
C	52	Rich Froistad (C)	6 ft 8 in (2.03 m)	—	Sr	Gladbrook, Iowa
F		Dave Fleming	—	—		Cedar Falls, Iowa
F		Steve Harmon	6 ft 5 in (1.96 m)	—		Chicago
F		Joe Hurst	6 ft 4 in (1.93 m)	—		Chicago
F		Gary Jones	6 ft 4 in (1.93 m)	—	So	Sioux City, Iowa
C		Bob Kilstrom	—	—		Sioux City, Iowa
F		Al Koch	6 ft 3 in (1.91 m)	—	So	Tipton, Iowa
G		Tim Lowe (C)	5 ft 10 in (1.78 m)	—	Sr	Marshalltown, Iowa
G		Don McKale	6 ft 1 in (1.85 m)	—	Jr	Albert City, Iowa
F		Tom Peterson (C)	6 ft 7 in (2.01 m)	—	Sr	Story City, Iowa
G		Wilbur Sandbulte	6 ft 2 in (1.88 m)	—	Jr	Sioux Center, Iowa
F		John Shaw	—	—		Des Moines, Iowa
G		Al Tubbs	6 ft 1 in (1.85 m)	—	So	Elwood, Iowa
G		Bob VanderWilt	6 ft 1 in (1.85 m)	—	Jr	Spencer, Iowa
F		Bill Wantiez	—	—	So	Marshalltown, Iowa
G		Bob Ziegler	6 ft 3 in (1.91 m)	—	So	Laurens, Iowa

Head coach

- Glen Anderson

Assistant coach(es)

Legend

- (C) Team captain
- (S) Suspended
- (I) Ineligible
- (W) Walk-on
- Injured
- Current redshirt

== Schedule and results ==
Date time, TV	Rank^{#}	Opponent^{#}	Result	Record	Site city, state
Regular season
December 2, 1963*; 7:35 pm		State College of Iowa (Northern Iowa); Iowa Big Four	L 54–59	0–1	Iowa State Armory (6,800); Ames, Iowa
December 3, 1963*; 8:00 pm		at Minnesota	L 50–61	0–2	Williams Arena; Minneapolis
December 7, 1963*; 8:00 pm		at Drake; Iowa Big Four	L 67–81	0–3	Veterans Memorial Auditorium; Des Moines, Iowa
December 14, 1963*; 7:35 pm		San Diego State	W 93–56	1–3	Iowa State Armory; Ames, Iowa
December 16, 1963*; 7:35 pm		Utah State	W 77–68	2–3	Iowa State Armory; Ames, Iowa
December 19, 1963*; 8:30 pm		at Marquette	L 62–67	2–4	Milwaukee Arena; Milwaukee
December 21, 1963*; 8:30 pm		South Dakota State	W 103–59	3–4	Iowa State Armory; Ames, Iowa
December 27, 1963*; 9:30 pm		vs. Oklahoma State; Big Eight Holiday Tournament Quarterfinals	L 61–73	3–5	Municipal Auditorium (7,900); Kansas City, Missouri
December 28, 1963*; 4:00 pm		vs. Colorado; Big Eight Holiday Tournament Consolation Semifinals	W 73–65	4–5	Municipal Auditorium; Kansas City, Missouri
December 30, 1963*; 4:00 pm		vs. Oklahoma; Big Eight Holiday Tournament Fifth Place	L 79–82	4–6	Municipal Auditorium; Kansas City, Missouri
January 6, 1964; 7:35 pm		Nebraska	L 52–55	4–7 (0–1)	Iowa State Armory; Ames, Iowa
January 11, 1964; 7:30 pm		at Kansas State	L 52–73	4–8 (0–2)	Ahearn Fieldhouse; Manhattan, Kansas
January 14, 1964*; 7:35 pm		Lima (Peru) Athletic Club	W 76–68	5–8	Iowa State Armory; Ames, Iowa
January 18, 1964; 7:35 pm		at Kansas	L 51–74	5–9 (0–3)	Allen Fieldhouse; Lawrence, Kansas
January 25, 1964; 7:35 pm		Oklahoma	W 87–77	6–9 (1–3)	Iowa State Armory; Ames, Iowa
January 28, 1964*; 7:35 pm		Drake; Iowa Big Four	L 53–63	6–10	Iowa State Armory; Ames, Iowa
February 1, 1964; 7:35 pm		at Oklahoma State	L 53–67	6–11 (1–4)	Gallagher Hall; Stillwater, Oklahoma
February 3, 1964; 8:00 pm		at Oklahoma	W 78–73	7–11 (2–4)	OU Fieldhouse; Norman, Oklahoma
February 8, 1964; 7:35 pm		Kansas	L 65–67	7–12 (2–5)	Iowa State Armory; Ames, Iowa
February 10, 1964; 7:35 pm		Missouri	W 83–79	8–12 (3–5)	Iowa State Armory; Ames, Iowa
February 15, 1964; 7:35 pm		Oklahoma State	W 50–48 ^{OT}	9–12 (4–5)	Iowa State Armory; Ames, Iowa
February 17, 1964; 7:35 pm		Colorado	W 60–58 ^{OT}	10–12 (5–5)	Iowa State Armory; Ames, Iowa
February 22, 1964; 8:05 pm		at Nebraska	L 55–57	10–13 (5–6)	Nebraska Coliseum; Lincoln, Nebraska
March 3, 1964; 7:30 pm		at Missouri	L 60–74	10–14 (5–7)	Brewer Fieldhouse; Columbia, Missouri
March 7, 1964; 9:05 pm		at Colorado	L 70–90	10–15 (5–8)	Balch Fieldhouse; Boulder, Colorado
March 9, 1964; 7:35 pm		Kansas State	L 69–74	10–16 (5–9)	Iowa State Armory; Ames, Iowa
*Non-conference game. ^{#}Rankings from AP poll. (#) Tournament seedings in parentheses. All times are in Central Time.
