= 1961–62 Iowa State Cyclones men's basketball team =

American college basketball season

1961–62 Iowa State Cyclones men's basketball
- Conference: Big Eight Conference
- Record: 13–12 (8–6 Big Eight)
- Head coach: Glen Anderson (3rd season)
- Assistant coach: Bob Lamson
- Home arena: Iowa State Armory

1961–62 Big Eight Conference men's basketball standings
	Conf.				Overall
Team	W		L	PCT	W		L	PCT
No. 9 Colorado	13	–	1	.929	19	–	7	.731
No. 6 Kansas State	12	–	2	.857	22	–	3	.880
Iowa State	8	–	6	.571	13	–	12	.520
Oklahoma State	7	–	7	.500	14	–	11	.560
Nebraska	5	–	9	.357	9	–	16	.360
Oklahoma	5	–	9	.357	7	–	17	.292
Missouri	3	–	11	.214	9	–	16	.360
Kansas	3	–	11	.214	7	–	18	.280
Rankings from AP Poll

The 1961–62 Iowa State Cyclones men's basketball team represented Iowa State University during the 1961–62 NCAA Division I men's basketball season. The Cyclones were coached by Glen Anderson, who was in his third season with the Cyclones. They played their home games at the Iowa State Armory in Ames, Iowa.

They finished the season 13–12, 8–6 in Big Eight play to finish in third place.

== Roster ==
1961–62 Iowa State Cyclones men's basketball team
Players
Coaches

Pos.	#	Name	Height	Weight	Year	Hometown
F		Vince Brewer	6 ft 3 in (1.91 m)	—	Jr
F	42	John Davidson	6 ft 5 in (1.96 m)	—	Jr
C	52	Rich Froistad	6 ft 8 in (2.03 m)	—	So	Gladbrook, Iowa
G		Dave Groth	6 ft 1 in (1.85 m)	—	Jr	Des Moines, Iowa
F	32	Gary Kleven	6 ft 5 in (1.96 m)	—	Jr
G	10	Tim Lowe	5 ft 10 in (1.78 m)	—	So	Marshalltown, Iowa
G	44	Jerry McColley	5 ft 10 in (1.78 m)	—	So	Oelwein, Iowa
F	34	Tom Peterson	6 ft 7 in (2.01 m)	—	So	Story City, Iowa
G		John Ptacek (C)	6 ft 4 in (1.93 m)	—	Sr
C	50	Bob Stoy (C)	—	—	Sr
F	40	Marv Straw	6 ft 4 in (1.93 m)	—	Jr
G	4	Gary Wheeler (C)	5 ft 10 in (1.78 m)	—	Sr
F	22	Martely Wynn	6 ft 2 in (1.88 m)	—

Head coach

- Glen Anderson

Assistant coach(es)

Bob Lamson

Legend

- (C) Team captain
- (S) Suspended
- (I) Ineligible
- (W) Walk-on
- Injured
- Current redshirt

== Schedule and results ==
Date time, TV	Rank^{#}	Opponent^{#}	Result	Record	Site city, state
Regular season
December 2, 1961*; 7:35 pm		Texas Western (UTEP)	L 59–66	0–1	Iowa State Armory; Ames, Iowa
December 4, 1961*; 7:35 pm		Marquette	W 72–68	1–1	Iowa State Armory; Ames, Iowa
December 9, 1961*; 7:00 pm		at Toledo	L 64–68	1–2	The Field House; Toledo, Ohio
December 11, 1961*; 7:45 pm		at Villanova	L 53–74	1–3	Villanova Fieldhouse; Philadelphia
December 16, 1961*; 1:30 pm		at Illinois	L 73–82	1–4	Huff Hall (6,437); Champaign, Illinois
December 18, 1961*; 8:15 pm		at Drake; Iowa Big Four	W 59–50	2–4	Veterans Memorial Auditorium; Des Moines, Iowa
December 23, 1961*; 8:45 pm		Indiana	W 83–70	3–4	Iowa State Armory; Ames, Iowa
December 28, 1961*; 9:30 pm		vs. Colorado; Big Eight Holiday Tournament Quarterfinals	W 62–52	4–4	Municipal Auditorium; Kansas City, Missouri
December 29, 1961*; 9:30 pm		vs. Oklahoma; Big Eight Holiday Tournament Semifinals	W 49–46	5–4	Municipal Auditorium; Kansas City, Missouri
December 30, 1961*; 9:30 pm		vs. No. 5 Kansas State; Big Eight Holiday Tournament Championship	L 67–69	5–5	Municipal Auditorium; Kansas City, Missouri
January 6, 1962; 7:35 pm		at Oklahoma	L 49–63	5–6 (0–1)	OU Fieldhouse; Norman, Oklahoma
January 8, 1962; 7:35 pm		at Oklahoma State	W 47–42	6–6 (1–1)	Gallagher Hall; Stillwater, Oklahoma
January 15, 1962; 7:35 pm		Colorado	L 55–58	6–7 (1–2)	Iowa State Armory; Ames, Iowa
January 20, 1962; 7:35 pm		Nebraska	W 84–72	7–7 (2–2)	Iowa State Armory; Ames, Iowa
January 27, 1962; 7:35 pm		No. 4 Kansas State	L 55–56	7–8 (2–3)	Iowa State Armory; Ames, Iowa
January 31, 1962; 7:35 pm		Missouri	W 85–73	8–8 (3–3)	Iowa State Armory; Ames, Iowa
February 3, 1962*; 7:35 pm		Drake; Iowa Big Four	L 63–73	8–9	Iowa State Armory; Ames, Iowa
February 7, 1962; 7:35 pm		Oklahoma	W 72–66	9–9 (4–3)	Iowa State Armory; Ames, Iowa
February 10, 1962; 7:35 pm		at Kansas	W 75–72	10–9 (5–3)	Allen Fieldhouse; Lawrence, Kansas
February 12, 1962; 8:05 pm		at Nebraska	W 79–66	11–9 (6–3)	Nebraska Coliseum; Lincoln, Nebraska
February 17, 1962; 7:35 pm		Oklahoma State	W 68–61	12–9 (7–3)	Iowa State Armory; Ames, Iowa
February 24, 1962; 9:05 pm		at No. 9 Colorado	L 69–74	12–10 (7–4)	Balch Fieldhouse; Boulder, Colorado
February 26, 1962; 7:30 pm		at No. 4 Kansas State	L 54–69	12–11 (7–5)	Ahearn Fieldhouse; Manhattan, Kansas
March 1, 1962; 8:00 pm		at Missouri	W 66–62	13–11 (8–5)	Brewer Fieldhouse; Columbia, Missouri
March 5, 1962; 7:35 pm		Kansas	L 71–76	13–12 (8–6)	Iowa State Armory; Ames, Iowa
*Non-conference game. ^{#}Rankings from AP poll. (#) Tournament seedings in parentheses. All times are in Central Time.
