= 1959–60 Iowa State Cyclones men's basketball team =

American college basketball season

1959–60 Iowa State Cyclones men's basketball

Big Eight Holiday Tournament Champions
- Conference: Big Eight Conference
- Record: 15–9 (7–7 Big Eight)
- Head coach: Glen Anderson (1st season)
- Home arena: Iowa State Armory

1959–60 Big Eight Conference men's basketball standings
	Conf.				Overall
Team	W		L	PCT	W		L	PCT
Kansas	10	–	4	.714	19	–	9	.679
Kansas State	10	–	4	.714	16	–	10	.615
Oklahoma	9	–	5	.643	14	–	11	.560
Colorado	7	–	7	.500	13	–	11	.542
Iowa State	7	–	7	.500	15	–	9	.625
Missouri	5	–	9	.357	12	–	13	.480
Oklahoma State	4	–	10	.286	10	–	15	.400
Nebraska	4	–	10	.286	7	–	17	.292
Rankings from AP Poll

The 1959–60 Iowa State Cyclones men's basketball team represented Iowa State University during the 1959–60 NCAA University Division men's basketball season. The Cyclones were coached by Glen Anderson, who was in his first season with the Cyclones. They played their home games at the Iowa State Armory in Ames, Iowa.

They finished the season 15–9, 7–7 in Big Eight play to finish in fourth place. They were Big Eight Holiday Tournament champions, defeating Kansas State, Colorado and Kansas in the December tournament.

== Roster ==
1959–60 Iowa State Cyclones men's basketball team
Players
Coaches

Pos.	#	Name	Height	Weight	Year	Hometown
		Sam Barnard	—	—		Oshkosh, Wisconsin
F		Vince Brewer	6 ft 3 in (1.91 m)	—	So	New York City
G		Nick Bruno	6 ft 3 in (1.91 m)	—	Jr	Staten Island, New York
F		Ted Ecker	—	—
G		Larry Fie (C)	—	—	Sr	Spencer, Iowa
G		Glen Mente	—	—	Jr	Wheatland, Iowa
F		Jay Murrell	—	—		Omaha, Nebraska
F		John O'Keefe	6 ft 4 in (1.93 m)	—
G		John Ptacek	6 ft 4 in (1.93 m)	—	So	Webster City, Iowa
C		Terry Roberts	—	—	Jr	Webster City, Iowa
C		Bob Stoy	—	—	So	Waterloo, Iowa
G		Gary Wheeler	5 ft 10 in (1.78 m)	—	So	Tama, Iowa
F		Henry Whitney	—	—	Jr	Brooklyn, New York

Head coach

- Glen Anderson

Assistant coach(es)

Legend

- (C) Team captain
- (S) Suspended
- (I) Ineligible
- (W) Walk-on
- Injured
- Current redshirt

== Schedule and results ==
Date time, TV	Rank^{#}	Opponent^{#}	Result	Record	Site city, state
Regular season
December 1, 1959*; 7:35 pm		South Dakota	W 66–47	1–0	Iowa State Armory; Ames, Iowa
December 5, 1959*; 1:30 pm		at Wisconsin	W 71–53	2–0	Wisconsin Field House; Madison, Wisconsin
December 10, 1959*; 7:35 pm		Utah State	L 66–71	2–1	Iowa State Armory; Ames, Iowa
December 18, 1959*; 10:00 pm		at Washington	W 60–56	3–1	Hec Edmundson Pavilion; Seattle
December 19, 1959*; 10:00 pm		at Washington	L 59–69	3–2	Hec Edmundson Pavilion; Seattle
December 23, 1959*; 8:30 pm		Drake; Iowa Big Four	W 58–54	4–2	Iowa State Armory; Ames, Iowa
December 26, 1959*; 7:30 pm		vs. Kansas State; Big Eight Holiday Tournament Quarterfinals	W 74–73 ^{OT}	5–2	Municipal Auditorium; Kansas City, Missouri
December 29, 1959*; 7:30 pm		vs. Colorado; Big Eight Holiday Tournament Semifinals	W 55–41	6–2	Municipal Auditorium; Kansas City, Missouri
December 30, 1959*; 9:30 pm		vs. Kansas; Big Eight Holiday Tournament Championship	W 83–70	7–2	Municipal Auditorium; Kansas City, Missouri
January 4, 1960; 7:35 pm		Nebraska	W 57–53	8–2 (1–0)	Iowa State Armory; Ames, Iowa
January 9, 1960; 8:00 pm		at Oklahoma State	W 49–48	9–2 (2–0)	Gallagher Hall; Stillwater, Oklahoma
January 11, 1960; 7:30 pm		at Oklahoma	L 47–65	9–3 (2–1)	OU Field House; Norman, Oklahoma
January 16, 1960; 7:35 pm		Oklahoma State	W 48–40	10–3 (3–1)	Iowa State Armory; Ames, Iowa
January 18, 1960; 7:35 pm		at Kansas State	L 66–68	10–4 (3–2)	Ahearn Field House; Manhattan, Kansas
January 23, 1960; 2:50 pm, Big Eight		Kansas	W 72–60	11–4 (4–2)	Iowa State Armory; Ames, Iowa
February 1, 1960; 7:30 pm		Colorado forfeit by Colorado	L 55–70	12–4 (5–2)	Iowa State Armory; Ames, Iowa
February 6, 1960; 7:35 pm		at Kansas	L 64–70	12–5 (5–3)	Allen Fieldhouse; Lawrence, Kansas
February 13, 1960; 8:05 pm		at Nebraska	L 49–69	12–6 (5–4)	Nebraska Coliseum; Lincoln, Nebraska
February 15, 1960; 7:35 pm		Kansas State	L 70–72	12–7 (5–5)	Iowa State Armory; Ames, Iowa
February 20, 1960; 2:50 pm, Big Eight		Oklahoma	L 47–58	12–8 (5–6)	Iowa State Armory; Ames, Iowa
February 27, 1960; 9:05 pm		at Colorado	W 83–80 ^{5OT}	13–8 (6–6)	Balch Fieldhouse; Boulder, Colorado
February 29, 1960; 7:35 pm		Missouri	W 92–69	14–8 (7–6)	Iowa State Armory; Ames, Iowa
March 2, 1960*; 8:15 pm		at Drake; Iowa Big Four	W 61–57	15–8	Veterans Memorial Auditorium; Des Moines, Iowa
March 7, 1960; 8:00 pm		at Missouri	L 57–59	15–9 (7–7)	Brewer Fieldhouse; Columbia, Missouri
*Non-conference game. ^{#}Rankings from AP poll. (#) Tournament seedings in parentheses. All times are in Central Time.
