= 1965–66 Kansas Jayhawks men's basketball team =

American college basketball season

1965–66 Kansas Jayhawks men's basketball

Big Eight Champions

NCAA tournament, Elite Eight
- Conference: Big Eight Conference

Ranking
- Coaches: No. 4
- AP: No. 4
- Record: 23–4 (13–1 Big 8)
- Head coach: Ted Owens (2nd season)
- Assistant coach: Harry Gibson (1st season)
- Captains: Del Lewis; Riney Lochmann
- Home arena: Allen Fieldhouse

1965–66 Big Eight Conference men's basketball standings
| | Conf. | | | | Overall |
| Team | W | | L | PCT | W | | L | PCT |
|---|---|---|---|---|---|---|---|---|
| No. 4 Kansas | 13 | – | 1 | .929 | 23 | – | 4 | .852 |
| Nebraska | 12 | – | 2 | .857 | 20 | – | 5 | .800 |
| Kansas State | 9 | – | 5 | .643 | 14 | – | 11 | .560 |
| Oklahoma | 7 | – | 7 | .500 | 11 | – | 14 | .440 |
| Colorado | 6 | – | 8 | .429 | 12 | – | 13 | .480 |
| Iowa State | 6 | – | 8 | .429 | 11 | – | 14 | .440 |
| Oklahoma State | 2 | – | 12 | .143 | 4 | – | 21 | .160 |
| Missouri | 1 | – | 13 | .071 | 3 | – | 21 | .125 |
Rankings from AP Poll

The 1965–66 Kansas Jayhawks men's basketball team represented the University of Kansas during the 1965–66 NCAA University Division men's basketball season. Led by second-year head coach Ted Owens, the fourth-ranked Jayhawks won the Big Eight Conference title and the automatic berth in the 22-team NCAA tournament.

Kansas' Elite Eight double-overtime loss to eventual champion Texas Western, (now UTEP), was featured in the 2006 film Glory Road.

== Roster ==
- Walt Wesley
- Al Lopes
- Del Lewis
- Ron Franz
- Rodger Bohnenstiehl
- Bob Wilson
- Riney Lochmann
- Jo Jo White
- Pat Davis
- Fred Chana
- John Carter

== Schedule ==
| Date time, TV | Rank^{#} | Opponent^{#} | Result | Record | Site city, state |
Regular Season
| December 1* | No. 8 | Arkansas | W 81–52 | 1–0 | Allen Fieldhouse; Lawrence, KS |
| December 4* | No. 8 | at Texas Tech | W 74–70 | 2–0 | Lubbock Municipal Coliseum; Lubbock, TX |
| December 7* | No. 7 | New Mexico State | W 102–51 | 3–0 | Allen Fieldhouse; Lawrence, KS |
| December 10* | No. 7 | Maryland | W 71–62 | 4–0 | Allen Fieldhouse; Lawrence, KS |
| December 11* | No. 7 | vs. St. John's | W 61–55 | 5–0 | Ahearn Field House; Manhattan, KS |
| December 17* | No. 4 | at No. 8 UCLA | L 71–78 | 5–1 | Pauley Pavilion; Los Angeles, CA |
| December 18* | No. 4 | at USC | L 69–81 | 5–2 | L.A. Sports Arena; Los Angeles, CA |
| December 23* | | at Ohio State | W 81–68 | 6–2 | St. John Arena; Columbus, OH |
| December 28 | | vs. Kansas State; Sunflower Showdown | W 69–63 | 7–2 | Municipal Auditorium; Kansas City, MO |
| December 29 | | vs. Iowa State | W 73–66 | 8–2 | Municipal Auditorium; Kansas City, MO |
| December 30 | | vs. Nebraska | W 71–61 | 9–2 | Municipal Auditorium; Kansas City, MO |
| January 3 | | at Colorado | W 69–55 | 10–2 (1–0) | Balch Fieldhouse; Boulder, CO |
| January 8 | | Iowa State | W 82–65 | 11–2 (2–0) | Allen Fieldhouse; Lawrence, KS |
| January 10 | | Oklahoma | W 89–68 | 12–2 (3–0) | Allen Fieldhouse; Lawrence, KS |
| January 15 | No. 10 | at Iowa State | W 49–47 | 13–2 (4–0) | The Armory; Ames, IA |
| January 18 | No. 6 | at Nebraska | L 75–83 | 13–3 (4–1) | Nebraska Coliseum; Lincoln, NE |
| January 22 | No. 6 | Kansas State; Sunflower Showdown | W 69–61 | 14–3 (5–1) | Allen Fieldhouse; Lawrence, KS |
| February 5 | No. 7 | at Missouri; Border War | W 77–54 | 15–3 (6–1) | Brewer Fieldhouse; Columbia, MO |
| February 12 | No. 7 | Oklahoma State | W 59–38 | 16–3 (7–1) | Allen Fieldhouse; Lawrence, KS |
| February 15 | No. 7 | Missouri; Border War | W 98–54 | 17–3 (8–1) | Allen Fieldhouse; Lawrence, KS |
| February 19 | No. 7 | at Oklahoma State | W 80–47 | 18–3 (9–1) | Gallagher-Iba Arena; Stillwater, OK |
| February 21 | No. 7 | at Oklahoma | W 86–69 | 19–3 (10–1) | Field House; Norman, OK |
| February 26 | No. 6 | No. 8 Nebraska | W 110–73 | 20–3 (11–1) | Allen Fieldhouse; Lawrence, KS |
| March 5 | No. 6 | at Kansas State; Sunflower Showdown | W 68–55 | 21–3 (12–1) | Ahearn Field House; Manhattan, KS |
| March 7 | No. 6 | Colorado | W 85–65 | 22–3 (13–1) | Allen Fieldhouse; Lawrence, KS |
NCAA Tournament
| March 11* | No. 4 | vs. SMU; Regional semifinal | W 76–70 | 23–3 | Lubbock Memorial Coliseum; Lubbock, TX |
| March 12* | No. 4 | vs. No. 3 Texas Western; Elite Eight | L 80–81 ^{2OT} | 23–4 | Lubbock Memorial Coliseum; Lubbock, TX |
*Non-conference game. ^{#}Rankings from AP Poll. (#) Tournament seedings in parentheses.
