= 1966–67 Iowa State Cyclones men's basketball team =

American college basketball season

1966–67 Iowa State Cyclones men's basketball
- Conference: Big Eight Conference
- Record: 13–12 (6–8 Big Eight)
- Head coach: Glen Anderson (8th season)
- Assistant coach: Bob Lamson
- Home arena: Iowa State Armory

1966–67 Big Eight Conference men's basketball standings
	Conf.				Overall
Team	W		L	PCT	W		L	PCT
No. 3 Kansas	13	–	1	.929	23	–	4	.852
Colorado	10	–	4	.714	17	–	8	.680
Nebraska	10	–	4	.714	16	–	9	.640
Kansas State	9	–	5	.643	17	–	8	.680
Iowa State	6	–	8	.429	13	–	12	.520
Oklahoma	5	–	9	.357	8	–	17	.320
Oklahoma State	2	–	12	.143	7	–	18	.280
Missouri	1	–	13	.071	3	–	22	.120
Rankings from AP Poll

The 1966–67 Iowa State Cyclones men's basketball team represented Iowa State University during the 1966–67 NCAA Division I men's basketball season. The Cyclones were coached by Glen Anderson, who was in his eighth season with the Cyclones. They played their home games at the Iowa State Armory in Ames, Iowa.

Assistant coach Bob Lamson died mid-season, on February 10, 1967.

They finished the season 13–12, 6–8 in Big Eight play to finish in fifth place.

== Roster ==
1966–67 Iowa State Cyclones men's basketball team
Players
Coaches

Pos.	#	Name	Height	Weight	Year	Hometown
F		Raul Duarte	6 ft 9 in (2.06 m)	—	Sr	Lima, Peru
C		Dave Fleming (C)	6 ft 5 in (1.96 m)	—	Sr	Cedar Falls, Iowa
G		Tom Goodman	5 ft 10 in (1.78 m)	—	So	Fort Dodge, Iowa
		Jim Hamberlin	6 ft 1 in (1.85 m)	—	Jr
G		Dave Hartman	6 ft 3 in (1.91 m)	—	So	Austin, Minnesota
		David Harvey	6 ft 4 in (1.93 m)	—	Sr	Goldfield, Iowa
F		Cole Johansen	6 ft 5 in (1.96 m)	—
F		Tom Kreamer	6 ft 5 in (1.96 m)	—	So	Des Moines, Iowa
G		John McGonigle	6 ft 3 in (1.91 m)	—	Jr	Moline, Illinois
F		Tom Pyle	6 ft 3 in (1.91 m)	—	So
F		Don Smith	6 ft 8 in (2.03 m)	—	Jr	Brooklyn, New York
		Wayne Tjernagel	6 ft 3 in (1.91 m)	—		Nevada, Iowa
G		Don Ziegler	6 ft 2 in (1.88 m)	—	Sr	Laurens, Iowa

Head coach

- Glen Anderson

Assistant coach(es)

Bob Lamson

Legend

- (C) Team captain
- (S) Suspended
- (I) Ineligible
- (W) Walk-on
- Injured
- Current redshirt

== Schedule and results ==
Date time, TV	Rank^{#}	Opponent^{#}	Result	Record	Site city, state
Regular season
December 1, 1966*; 7:30 pm		at State College of Iowa (Northern Iowa); Iowa Big Four	W 79–78	1–0	McElroy Auditorium (3,500); Waterloo, Iowa
December 3, 1966*; 7:35 pm, WOI (delay)		Ohio State	L 77–79	1–1	Iowa State Armory (7,000); Ames, Iowa
December 5, 1966*; 7:35 pm, WOI (delay)		Minnesota	W 87–69	2–1	Iowa State Armory (7,000); Ames, Iowa
December 13, 1966*; 7:30 pm		at Wisconsin	L 73–80	2–2	UW Fieldhouse; Madison, Wisconsin
December 15, 1966*; 7:35 pm, WOI		Drake; Iowa Big Four	W 87–77	3–2	Iowa State Armory; Ames, Iowa
December 20, 1966*; 8:30 pm		vs. USC; Sun Devil Classic Semifinals	W 89–68	4–2	Arizona Veterans Memorial Coliseum; Phoenix, Arizona
December 21, 1966*; 10:30 pm		vs. Texas; Sun Devil Classic Championship	W 101–87	5–2	Arizona Veterans Memorial Coliseum; Phoenix, Arizona
December 27, 1966*; 7:30 pm		vs. Oklahoma State; Big Eight Holiday Tournament Quarterfinals	W 64–56	6–2	Municipal Auditorium (6,800); Kansas City, Missouri
December 29, 1966*; 7:30 pm		vs. Kansas State; Big Eight Holiday Tournament Semifinals	W 78–67	7–2	Municipal Auditorium (10,007); Kansas City, Missouri
December 30, 1966*; 9:30 pm		vs. Kansas; Big Eight Holiday Tournament Championship	L 57–63	7–3	Municipal Auditorium; Kansas City, Missouri
January 7, 1967; 1:15 pm, Big Eight		at Missouri	W 67–61	8–3 (1–0)	Brewer Fieldhouse; Columbia, Missouri
January 9, 1967; 7:35 pm, WOI (delay)		Oklahoma State	W 54–38	9–3 (2–0)	Iowa State Armory; Ames, Iowa
January 12, 1967; 7:35 pm, WOI (delay)		Colorado	L 52–64	9–4 (2–1)	Iowa State Armory; Ames, Iowa
January 14, 1967; 7:30 pm		at Kansas State	L 72–73 ^{OT}	9–5 (2–2)	Ahearn Fieldhouse; Manhattan, Kansas
January 19, 1967*; 8:00 pm		at Drake; Iowa Big Four	L 57–70	9–6	Veterans Memorial Auditorium; Des Moines, Iowa
January 21, 1967; 8:05 pm		at No. 7 Kansas	L 65–73	9–7 (2–3)	Allen Fieldhouse; Lawrence, Kansas
January 28, 1967; 1:15 pm, Big Eight		Oklahoma	W 93–87	10–7 (3–3)	Iowa State Armory; Ames, Iowa
January 31, 1967; 7:35 pm, WOI (delay)		Missouri	W 72–58	11–7 (4–3)	Iowa State Armory; Ames, Iowa
February 4, 1967; 7:35 pm, WOI (delay)		No. 7 Kansas	L 50–68	11–8 (4–4)	Iowa State Armory; Ames, Iowa
February 11, 1967; 7:35 pm		at Nebraska	L 82–94	11–9 (4–5)	Nebraska Coliseum; Lincoln, Nebraska
February 13, 1967; 9:05 pm		at Colorado	L 55–67	11–10 (4–6)	Balch Fieldhouse; Boulder, Colorado
February 18, 1967; 1:15 pm, Big Eight		Nebraska	L 65–76	11–11 (4–7)	Iowa State Armory; Ames, Iowa
March 2, 1967; 7:35 pm		at Oklahoma State	W 84–71	12–11 (5–7)	Gallagher Hall; Stillwater, Oklahoma
March 4, 1967; 8:00 pm		at Oklahoma	W 69–63	13–11 (6–7)	OU Fieldhouse; Norman, Oklahoma
March 6, 1967; 7:35 pm, WOI (delay)		Kansas State	L 68–81	13–12 (6–8)	Iowa State Armory; Ames, Iowa
*Non-conference game. ^{#}Rankings from AP poll. (#) Tournament seedings in parentheses. All times are in Central Time.
