= 1968–69 Kansas Jayhawks men's basketball team =

American college basketball season

1968–69 Kansas Jayhawks men's basketball

NIT, First Round
- Conference: Big Eight Conference

Ranking
- Coaches: No. 20
- AP: No. 19
- Record: 20–7 (9–5 Big 8)
- Head coach: Ted Owens (5th season)
- Assistant coaches: Gale Catlett (2nd season); Sam Miranda (3rd season)
- Captains: Bruce Sloan; Jo Jo White
- Home arena: Allen Fieldhouse

1968–69 Big Eight Conference men's basketball standings
	Conf.				Overall
Team	W		L	PCT	W		L	PCT
No. 18 Colorado	10	–	4	.714	21	–	7	.750
No. 19 Kansas	9	–	5	.643	20	–	7	.741
Kansas State	9	–	5	.643	14	–	12	.538
Iowa State	8	–	6	.571	14	–	12	.538
Missouri	7	–	7	.500	14	–	11	.560
Oklahoma State	5	–	9	.357	12	–	13	.480
Nebraska	5	–	9	.357	12	–	14	.462
Oklahoma	3	–	11	.214	7	–	19	.269
Rankings from AP Poll

The 1968–69 Kansas Jayhawks men's basketball team represented the University of Kansas during the 1968–69 college men's basketball season. On February 3, 1969, the Jayhawks reached the milestone victory by recording their thousandth win for the program by defeating the Oklahoma State Cowboys in Lawrence.

== Roster ==
- Dave Robisch
- Jo Jo White
- Bruce Sloan
- Rich Bradshaw
- Pierre Russell
- Roger Brown
- Phil Harmon
- Greg Douglas
- Dave Nash
- Tim Natsus
- Howard Arndt
- Chester Lawrence

== Schedule ==
Date time, TV	Rank^{#}	Opponent^{#}	Result	Record	Site city, state
November 30*	No. 5	Saint Louis	W 88–65	1-0	Allen Fieldhouse; Lawrence, KS
December 3*	No. 4	at Wisconsin	L 62–67	1-1	Wisconsin Field House; Madison, WI
December 7*	No. 4	Loyola (IL)	W 93–61	2-1	Allen Fieldhouse; Lawrence, KS
December 9*	No. 4	Xavier	W 79–56	3-1	Allen Fieldhouse; Lawrence, KS
December 13*	No. 11	vs. Creighton	W 78–65	4-1	Ahearn Field House; Manhattan, KS
December 14*	No. 11	Syracuse	W 71–41	5-1	Allen Fieldhouse; Lawrence, KS
December 16*	No. 11	Murray State	W 72–59	6-1	Allen Fieldhouse; Lawrence, KS
December 20	No. 11	at Utah State	W 67–61	7-1	Nelson Fieldhouse; Logan, UT
December 21	No. 11	at Stanford	W 76–67	8-1	Maples Pavilion; Stanford, CA
December 26	No. 8	vs. Nebraska	W 82–56	9-1	Municipal Auditorium; Kansas City, MO
December 28	No. 8	vs. Colorado	W 60–55	10-1	Municipal Auditorium; Kansas City, MO
December 30	No. 8	vs. Oklahoma State	W 56–45	11-1	Municipal Auditorium; Kansas City, MO
January 4	No. 5	at Nebraska	W 56–52	12-1 (1-0)	Nebraska Coliseum; Lincoln, NE
January 6	No. 5	Iowa State	W 94–61	13-1 (2-0)	Allen Fieldhouse; Lawrence, KS
January 11	No. 5	at Missouri; Border War	L 46–47	13-2 (2-1)	Brewer Fieldhouse; Columbia, MO
January 13	No. 5	at Iowa State	L 72–78	13-3 (2-2)	Iowa State Armory; Ames, IA
January 18	No. 10	at Kansas State; Sunflower Showdown	W 73–67	14-3 (3-2)	Ahrean Field House; Manhattan, KS
February 1	No. 15	No. 17 Colorado	W 80–70	15-3 (4-2)	Allen Fieldhouse; Lawrence, KS
February 3	No. 15	Oklahoma State	W 64–48	16-3 (5-2)	Allen Fieldhouse; Lawrence, KS
February 8	No. 13	at Oklahoma	W 66–59 ^{OT}	17-3 (6-2)	McCasland Field House; Norman, OK
February 10	No. 13	at Oklahoma State	W 45–41	18-3 (7-2)	Gallagher-Iba Arena; Stillwater, OK
February 15	No. 12	Missouri; Border War	L 55–56	18-4 (7-3)	Allen Fieldhouse; Lawrence, KS
February 22	No. 16	Nebraska	W 79–73	19-4 (8-3)	Allen Fieldhouse; Lawrence, KS
February 24	No. 16	Oklahoma	W 83–58	20-4 (9-3)	Allen Fieldhouse; Lawrence, KS
March 1	No. 13	at Colorado	L 67–75	20-5 (9-4)	Balch Fieldhouse; Boulder, CO
March 8	No. 13	Kansas State; Sunflower Showdown	L 57–64	20-6 (9-5)	Allen Fieldhouse; Lawrence, KS
March 16	No. 19	vs. No. 16 Boston College; NIT First Round	L 62–78	20-7	Madison Square Garden; New York, NY
*Non-conference game. ^{#}Rankings from AP Poll. (#) Tournament seedings in parentheses.
