= 1960–61 Iowa State Cyclones men's basketball team =

American college basketball season

1960–61 Iowa State Cyclones men's basketball
- Conference: Big Eight Conference
- Record: 14–11 (8–6 Big Eight)
- Head coach: Glen Anderson (2nd season)
- Home arena: Iowa State Armory

1960–61 Big Eight Conference men's basketball standings
	Conf.				Overall
Team	W		L	PCT	W		L	PCT
No. 4 Kansas State	12	–	2	.857	22	–	5	.815
Kansas	10	–	4	.714	17	–	8	.680
Oklahoma State	8	–	6	.571	14	–	11	.560
Missouri	7	–	7	.500	11	–	13	.458
Iowa State	6	–	8	.429	14	–	11	.560
Nebraska	4	–	10	.286	10	–	14	.417
Oklahoma	2	–	12	.143	10	–	15	.400
Colorado	7	–	7	.500	15	–	10	.600
Rankings from AP Poll

The 1960–61 Iowa State Cyclones men's basketball team represented Iowa State University during the 1960–61 NCAA University Division men's basketball season. The Cyclones were coached by Glen Anderson, who was in his second season with the Cyclones. They played their home games at the Iowa State Armory in Ames, Iowa.

They finished the season 14–11, 8–6 in Big Eight play to finish tied for fourth place.

== Roster ==
1960–61 Iowa State Cyclones men's basketball team
Players
Coaches

Pos.	#	Name	Height	Weight	Year	Hometown
		Sam Barnard	6 ft 6 in (1.98 m)	—	Sr	Oshkosh, Wisconsin
		Vinnie Brewer	6 ft 3 in (1.91 m)	—	So	New York City
G		Nick Bruno	6 ft 3 in (1.91 m)	—	Sr	Staten Island, New York
F		John Davidson	6 ft 5 in (1.96 m)	—	So	Las Animas, Colorado
G		Nelson Davis	6 ft 3 in (1.91 m)	—	So	Danville, Illinois
G		Dave Groth	6 ft 1 in (1.85 m)	—	So	Des Moines, Iowa
F		Gary Kleven	6 ft 5 in (1.96 m)	—	So	Westbrook, Minnesota
G		Glen Mente	6 ft 1 in (1.85 m)	—	Sr	Wheatland, Iowa
F		Jay Murrell	6 ft 5 in (1.96 m)	—	Jr	Omaha, Nebraska
G		John Ptacek	6 ft 4 in (1.93 m)	—	Jr	Webster City, Iowa
C		Terry Roberts	6 ft 11 in (2.11 m)	—	Sr	Webster City, Iowa
C		Bob Stoy	6 ft 8 in (2.03 m)	—	Jr	Waterloo, Iowa
F		Marv Straw	6 ft 4 in (1.93 m)	—	So	Lee, Illinois
G		Gary Wheeler	5 ft 10 in (1.78 m)	—	Jr	Tama, Iowa
F		Henry Whitney (C)	6 ft 7 in (2.01 m)	—	Sr	Brooklyn, New York

Head coach

- Glen Anderson

Assistant coach(es)

Legend

- (C) Team captain
- (S) Suspended
- (I) Ineligible
- (W) Walk-on
- Injured
- Current redshirt

== Schedule and results ==
Date time, TV	Rank^{#}	Opponent^{#}	Result	Record	Site city, state
Regular season
December 5, 1960*; 7:35 pm		Wisconsin	W 88–76	1–0	Iowa State Armory; Ames, Iowa
December 10, 1960*; 8:00 pm		at No. 16 Wichita (State)	L 58–75	1–1	Wichita Fieldhouse; Wichita, Kansas
December 16, 1960*; 7:35 pm		Washington	W 63–60	2–1	Iowa State Armory; Ames, Iowa
December 17, 1960*; 8:45 pm		Washington	W 60–50	3–1	Iowa State Armory; Ames, Iowa
December 20, 1960*; 8:00 pm		at Marquette	L 62–70	3–2	Milwaukee Arena; Milwaukee
December 22, 1960*; 7:00 pm		at Michigan State	L 81–92	3–3	Jenison Fieldhouse; East Lansing, Michigan
December 27, 1960*; 9:30 pm		vs. Missouri; Big Eight Holiday Tournament Quarterfinals	W 72–68	4–3	Municipal Auditorium; Kansas City, Missouri
December 28, 1960*; 9:30 pm		vs. Kansas; Big Eight Holiday Tournament Semifinals	L 72–76	4–4	Municipal Auditorium (10,000); Kansas City, Missouri
December 29, 1960*; 7:30 pm		vs. Oklahoma; Big Eight Holiday Tournament Third Place	W 67–55	5–4	Municipal Auditorium; Kansas City, Missouri
January 7, 1961; 7:35 pm		Colorado forfeit by Colorado	L 60–61	6–4 (1–0)	Iowa State Armory; Ames, Iowa
January 9, 1961; 7:35 pm		Missouri	W 76–67	7–4 (2–0)	Iowa State Armory; Ames, Iowa
January 14, 1961; 7:30 pm		at Kansas	L 59–90	7–5 (2–1)	Allen Fieldhouse; Lawrence, Kansas
January 18, 1961*; 7:35 pm		Drake; Iowa Big Four	W 71–70	8–5	Iowa State Armory; Ames, Iowa
January 21, 1961; 8:05 pm		at Nebraska	W 66–58	9–5 (3–1)	Nebraska Coliseum; Lincoln, Nebraska
January 28, 1961; 9:05 pm		at Colorado; Forfeit by Colorado	L 65–67	10–5 (4–1)	Balch Fieldhouse; Boulder, Colorado
January 30, 1961; 7:35 pm		Kansas State	L 70–72	10–6 (4–2)	Iowa State Armory; Ames, Iowa
February 1, 1961*; 8:15 pm		at Drake; Iowa Big Four	L 81–83	10–7	Veterans Memorial Auditorium; Des Moines, Iowa
February 6, 1961; 7:35 pm		Oklahoma State	W 80–63	11–7 (5–2)	Iowa State Armory; Ames, Iowa
February 11, 1961; 7:35 pm		at No. 7 Kansas State	L 55–56	11–8 (5–3)	Ahearn Field House; Manhattan, Kansas
February 13, 1961; 7:35 pm		Nebraska	W 68–62	12–8 (6–3)	Iowa State Armory; Ames, Iowa
February 18, 1961; 7:35 pm		Oklahoma	W 57–56	13–8 (7–3)	Iowa State Armory; Ames, Iowa
February 25, 1961; 7:35 pm		at Oklahoma	W 61–55	14–8 (8–3)	OU Field House; Norman, Oklahoma
February 27, 1961; 7:35 pm		at Oklahoma State	L 55–59	14–9 (8–4)	Gallagher Hall; Stillwater, Oklahoma
March 2, 1961; 8:05 pm		at Missouri	L 82–95	14–10 (8–5)	Brewer Fieldhouse; Columbia, Missouri
March 6, 1961; 7:35 pm		Kansas	L 75–85	14–11 (8–6)	Iowa State Armory; Ames, Iowa
*Non-conference game. ^{#}Rankings from AP poll. (#) Tournament seedings in parentheses. All times are in Central Time.
