= Oklahoma Sooners men's basketball, 1960–1969 =

American college basketball season

== 1959–60 season ==
1959–60 Oklahoma Sooners men's basketball
- Conference: Big Eight Conference
- Record: 14–11 (9–5 Big Eight)
- Head coach: Doyle Parrack (5th season)
- Home arena: McCasland Field House

1959–60 Big Eight Conference men's basketball standings
	Conf.				Overall
Team	W		L	PCT	W		L	PCT
Kansas	10	–	4	.714	19	–	9	.679
Kansas State	10	–	4	.714	16	–	10	.615
Oklahoma	9	–	5	.643	14	–	11	.560
Colorado	7	–	7	.500	13	–	11	.542
Iowa State	7	–	7	.500	15	–	9	.625
Missouri	5	–	9	.357	12	–	13	.480
Oklahoma State	4	–	10	.286	10	–	15	.400
Nebraska	4	–	10	.286	7	–	17	.292
Rankings from AP Poll

The 1959–60 Oklahoma Sooners men's basketball team represented the University of Oklahoma in the 1959–60 NCAA University Division men's basketball season college basketball season as a member of the Big Eight Conference. The Sooners finished the season with a 14–11 overall record, and finished third in the Big Eight Conference with a 9–5 conference record. They were coached by Doyle Parrack in his fifth season as head coach of the Sooners. They played their home games at McCasland Field House in Norman, Oklahoma.

=== Schedule ===
Date time, TV	Rank^{#}	Opponent^{#}	Result	Record	Site city, state
Regular season
December 2, 1959*		Texas Western	W 76–58	1–0	McCasland Field House; Norman, OK
December 5, 1959*		Hardin–Simmons	W 59–46	2–0	McCasland Field House; Norman, OK
December 9, 1959		at Texas Tech	W 56–43	3–0	Lubbock Municipal Coliseum; Lubbock, TX
December 12, 1959		at Minnesota	L 57–59	3–1	Williams Arena; Minneapolis, MN
December 15, 1959*		SMU	W 65–57	4–1	McCasland Field House; Norman, OK
December 19, 1959*		at Iowa	L 49–62	4–2	Iowa Field House; Iowa City, IA
December 21, 1959*		at No. 10 Illinois	L 57–60 ^{OT}	4–3	Huff Hall; Champaign, IL
December 23, 1959*		Minnesota	L 56–57	4–4	McCasland Field House; Norman, OK
December 28, 1959		vs. Missouri; Big Eight Holiday Tournament	W 70–65	5–4	Municipal Auditorium; Kansas City, MO
December 29, 1959		vs. Kansas; Big Eight Holiday Tournament	L 54–55	5–5	Municipal Auditorium; Kansas City, MO
December 30, 1959		vs. Colorado; Big Eight Holiday Tournament	L 57–61	5–6	Municipal Auditorium; Kansas City, MO
January 8, 1960		at Colorado	W 64–62 ^{2 OT}	6–6 (1–0)	Balch Fieldhouse; Boulder, CO
January 11, 1960		Iowa State	W 65–47	7–6 (2–0)	McCasland Field House; Norman, OK
January 16, 1960		at Kansas State	L 68–76	7–7 (2–1)	Ahearn Field House; Manhattan, KS
January 18, 1960		Missouri	W 64–52	8–7 (3–1)	McCasland Field House; Norman, OK
January 30, 1960		Oklahoma State; Bedlam Series	L 48–59	8–8 (3–2)	McCasland Field House; Norman, OK
February 6, 1960		at Missouri	L 72–84	9–8 (3–3)	Brewer Fieldhouse; Columbia, MO
February 8, 1960		Nebraska	W 63–54	9–9 (4–3)	McCasland Field House; Norman, OK
February 15, 1960		Kansas	L 53–54	9–10 (4–4)	McCasland Field House; Norman, OK
February 20, 1960		at Iowa State	W 58–47	10–10 (5–4)	Iowa State Armory; Ames, IA
February 22, 1960		at Nebraska	W 50–49	11–10 (6–4)	Nebraska Coliseum; Lincoln, NE
February 24, 1960		at Oklahoma State; Bedlam Series	W 59–53	12–10 (7–4)	Gallagher Hall; Stillwater, OK
February 27, 1960		Kansas State	W 58–35	13–10 (8–4)	McCasland Field House; Norman, OK
March 1, 1960		at Kansas	L 52–65	13–11 (8–5)	Allen Fieldhouse; Lawrence, KS
March 3, 1960		Colorado	W 63–61 ^{OT}	14–11 (9–5)	McCasland Field House; Norman, OK
*Non-conference game. ^{#}Rankings from AP Poll. (#) Tournament seedings in parentheses. All times are in Central Time..

== 1960–61 season ==
1960–61 Oklahoma Sooners men's basketball
- Conference: Big Eight Conference
- Record: 10–15 (2–12 Big Eight)
- Head coach: Doyle Parrack (6th season)
- Home arena: McCasland Field House

1960–61 Big Eight Conference men's basketball standings
	Conf.				Overall
Team	W		L	PCT	W		L	PCT
No. 4 Kansas State	12	–	2	.857	22	–	5	.815
Kansas	10	–	4	.714	17	–	8	.680
Oklahoma State	8	–	6	.571	14	–	11	.560
Missouri	7	–	7	.500	11	–	13	.458
Iowa State	6	–	8	.429	14	–	11	.560
Nebraska	4	–	10	.286	10	–	14	.417
Oklahoma	2	–	12	.143	10	–	15	.400
Colorado	7	–	7	.500	15	–	10	.600
Rankings from AP Poll

The 1960–61 Oklahoma Sooners men's basketball team represented the University of Oklahoma in the 1960–61 NCAA University Division men's basketball season college basketball season as a member of the Big Eight Conference. They finished the season with a 10–15 overall record, and finished seventh in the Big Eight Conference with a 2–12 conference record. They were coached by Doyle Parrack in his fifth season as head coach of the Sooners. They played their home games at McCasland Field House in Norman, Oklahoma.

=== Schedule ===
Date time, TV	Rank^{#}	Opponent^{#}	Result	Record	Site city, state
Regular season
December 1, 1960*		Texas Western	W 70–58	1–0	McCasland Field House; Norman, OK
December 3, 1960*		Minnesota	W 60–56	2–0	McCasland Field House; Norman, OK
December 9, 1960*		at BYU	W 60–56	3–0	Smith Fieldhouse; Provo, UT
December 13, 1960*		at SMU	L 61–67	3–1	Moody Coliseum; Dallas, TX
December 15, 1960*		at Houston	W 55–51	4–1	Jeppesen Field House; Houston, TX
December 16, 1960*		vs. Texas A&M	W 69–56	5–1	Rice Gymnasium; Houston, TX
December 19, 1960*		Colorado State	W 56–50	6–1	McCasland Field House; Norman, OK
December 22, 1960*		Texas Tech	W 75–56	7–1	McCasland Field House; Norman, OK
December 26, 1960		vs. Colorado; Big Eight Holiday Tournament	W 64–60	8–1	Municipal Auditorium; Kansas City, MO
December 28, 1960		vs. No. 12 Kansas State; Big Eight Holiday Tournament	L 52–73	8–2	Municipal Auditorium; Kansas City, MO
December 29, 1960		vs. Iowa State; Big Eight Holiday Tournament	L 55–67	8–3	Municipal Auditorium; Kansas City, MO
January 7, 1961		Kansas	L 55–58	8–4 (0–1)	McCasland Field House; Norman, OK
January 14, 1961		at No. 9 Kansas State	L 57–69	8–5 (0–2)	Ahearn Field House; Manhattan, KS
January 16, 1961		at Colorado	W 56–47	9–5 (1–2)	Balch Fieldhouse; Boulder, CO
January 21, 1961		at Missouri	L 62–70	9–6 (1–3)	Brewer Fieldhouse; Columbia, MO
February 4, 1961		No. 9 Kansas State	L 63–71	9–7 (1–4)	McCasland Field House; Norman, OK
February 6, 1961		Nebraska	W 69–58	10–7 (2–4)	McCasland Field House; Norman, OK
February 11, 1961		Missouri	L 78–94	10–8 (2–5)	McCasland Field House; Norman, OK
February 14, 1961		at Oklahoma State; Bedlam Series	L 42–48	10–9 (2–6)	Gallagher Hall; Stillwater, OK
February 18, 1961		at Iowa State	L 56–57	10–10 (2–7)	Iowa State Armory; Ames, IA
February 20, 1961		at Nebraska	L 61–83	10–11 (2–8)	Nebraska Coliseum; Lincoln, NE
February 25, 1961		Iowa State	L 55–61	10–12 (2–9)	McCasland Field House; Norman, OK
February 28, 1961		at Kansas	L 56–81	10–13 (2–10)	Allen Fieldhouse; Lawrence, KS
March 6, 1961		Colorado	L 45–52	10–14 (2–11)	McCasland Field House; Norman, OK
March 9, 1961		Oklahoma State; Bedlam Series	L 47–60	10–15 (2–12)	McCasland Field House; Norman, OK
*Non-conference game. ^{#}Rankings from AP Poll. (#) Tournament seedings in parentheses. All times are in Central Time..

== 1961–62 season ==
1961–62 Oklahoma Sooners men's basketball
- Conference: Big Eight Conference
- Record: 7–17 (5–9 Big Eight)
- Head coach: Doyle Parrack (7th season)
- Home arena: McCasland Field House

1961–62 Big Eight Conference men's basketball standings
	Conf.				Overall
Team	W		L	PCT	W		L	PCT
No. 9 Colorado	13	–	1	.929	19	–	7	.731
No. 6 Kansas State	12	–	2	.857	22	–	3	.880
Iowa State	8	–	6	.571	13	–	12	.520
Oklahoma State	7	–	7	.500	14	–	11	.560
Nebraska	5	–	9	.357	9	–	16	.360
Oklahoma	5	–	9	.357	7	–	17	.292
Missouri	3	–	11	.214	9	–	16	.360
Kansas	3	–	11	.214	7	–	18	.280
Rankings from AP Poll

The 1961–62 Oklahoma Sooners men's basketball team represented the University of Oklahoma in the 1961–62 NCAA University Division men's basketball season college basketball season as a member of the Big Eight Conference. They finished the season with a 7–19 overall record, and finished tied for fifth in the Big Eight Conference with a 5–9 conference record. They were coached by Doyle Parrack in his sixth season as head coach of the Sooners. They played their home games at McCasland Field House in Norman, Oklahoma.

=== Schedule ===
Date time, TV	Rank^{#}	Opponent^{#}	Result	Record	Site city, state
Regular season
December 2, 1961*		USC	W 66–56	1–0	McCasland Field House; Norman, OK
December 5, 1961*		SMU	L 52–61	1–1	McCasland Field House; Norman, OK
December 9, 1961*		Illinois	L 60–72	1–2	McCasland Field House; Norman, OK
December 12, 1961*		at St. John's	L 49–68	1–3	Alumni Hall; New York, NY
December 16, 1961*		BYU	L 74–81	1–4	McCasland Field House; Norman, OK
December 19, 1961*		at Texas Tech	L 42–70	1–5	Lubbock Municipal Coliseum; Lubbock, TX
December 23, 1961*		Colorado State	L 47–52	1–6	McCasland Field House; Norman, OK
December 28, 1961		vs. Kansas; Big Eight Holiday Tournament	W 61–60	2–6	Municipal Auditorium; Kansas City, MO
December 29, 1961		vs. Iowa State; Big Eight Holiday Tournament	L 46–49	2–7	Municipal Auditorium; Kansas City, MO
December 30, 1961		vs. Missouri; Big Eight Holiday Tournament	L 58–63 ^{OT}	2–8	Municipal Auditorium; Kansas City, MO
January 6, 1962		Iowa State	W 63–49	3–8 (1–0)	McCasland Field House; Norman, OK
January 8, 1962		Missouri	W 56–52	4–8 (2–0)	McCasland Field House; Norman, OK
January 10, 1962		at Nebraska	L 56–57	4–9 (2–1)	Nebraska Coliseum; Lincoln, NE
January 31, 1962		Oklahoma State; Bedlam Series	L 49–65	4–10 (2–2)	McCasland Field House; Norman, OK
February 5, 1962		Colorado	L 50–54	4–11 (2–3)	McCasland Field House; Norman, OK
February 7, 1962		at Iowa State	L 66–72	4–12 (2–4)	Iowa State Armory; Ames, IA
February 12, 1962		at Colorado	L 56–64	4–13 (2–5)	Balch Fieldhouse; Boulder, CO
February 17, 1962		No. 4 Kansas State	L 63–71	4–14 (2–6)	McCasland Field House; Norman, OK
February 19, 1962		at Kansas	W 67–66 ^{OT}	5–14 (3–6)	Allen Fieldhouse; Lawrence, KS
February 24, 1962		at No. 4 Kansas State	L 57–89	5–15 (3–7)	Ahearn Field House; Manhattan, KS
February 28, 1962		Kansas	W 63–62	6–15 (4–7)	McCasland Field House; Norman, OK
March 5, 1962		Nebraska	L 69–71 ^{OT}	6–16 (4–8)	McCasland Field House; Norman, OK
March 8, 1962		at Missouri	W 63–55	7–16 (5–8)	Brewer Fieldhouse; Columbia, MO
March 8, 1962		at Oklahoma State; Bedlam Series	L 62–68	7–17 (5–9)	Gallagher Hall; Stillwater, OK
*Non-conference game. ^{#}Rankings from AP Poll. (#) Tournament seedings in parentheses. All times are in Central Time..

=== After the season ===
==== NBA draft ====
The following Sooner was selected in the 1962 NBA draft.

Round	Pick	Player	Position	NBA club
8	64	Warren Fouts	Forward	New York Knicks

== 1962–63 season ==
1962–63 Oklahoma Sooners men's basketball
- Conference: Big Eight Conference
- Record: 12–13 (8–6 Big Eight)
- Head coach: Bob Stevens (1st season)
- Home arena: McCasland Field House

1962–63 Big Eight Conference men's basketball standings
	Conf.				Overall
Team	W		L	PCT	W		L	PCT
No. 10 Colorado	11	–	3	.786	19	–	7	.731
Kansas State	11	–	3	.786	16	–	9	.640
Iowa State	8	–	6	.571	14	–	11	.560
Oklahoma	8	–	6	.571	12	–	13	.480
Oklahoma State	7	–	7	.500	16	–	9	.640
Kansas	5	–	9	.357	12	–	13	.480
Missouri	5	–	9	.357	10	–	15	.400
Nebraska	1	–	13	.071	6	–	19	.240
Rankings from AP Poll

The 1962–63 Oklahoma Sooners men's basketball team represented the University of Oklahoma in the 1962–63 NCAA University Division men's basketball season college basketball season as a member of the Big Eight Conference. They finished the season with a 12–13 overall record, and finished tied for third in the Big Eight Conference with an 8–6 conference record. They were coached by former South Carolina head coach Bob Stevens in his first season as head coach of the Sooners. They played their home games at McCasland Field House in Norman, Oklahoma.

=== Schedule ===
Date time, TV	Rank^{#}	Opponent^{#}	Result	Record	Site city, state
Regular season
December 4, 1962*		at SMU	W 96–83	1–0	Moody Coliseum; Dallas, TX
December 8, 1962*		St. John's	W 84–65	2–0	McCasland Field House; Norman, OK
December 10, 1962*		Southern Illinois	L 63–66	2–1	McCasland Field House; Norman, OK
December 14, 1962*		at UCLA	L 64–101	2–2	Los Angeles Memorial Sports Arena; Los Angeles, CA
December 15, 1962*		at USC	L 51–66	2–3	Los Angeles Memorial Sports Arena; Los Angeles, CA
December 18, 1962*		Texas Tech	W 85–62	3–3	McCasland Field House; Norman, OK
December 21, 1962*		at Purdue	W 80–79	4–3	Lambert Fieldhouse; West Lafayette, IN
December 22, 1962*		at No. 8 Illinois	L 90–93	4–4	Huff Hall; Champaign, IL
December 27, 1962		vs. Oklahoma State; Big Eight Holiday Tournament, Bedlam Series	L 48–49	4–5	Municipal Auditorium; Kansas City, MO
December 28, 1962		vs. Missouri; Big Eight Holiday Tournament	L 82–104	4–6	Municipal Auditorium; Kansas City, MO
December 29, 1962		vs. Nebraska; Big Eight Holiday Tournament	L 86–93	4–7	Municipal Auditorium; Kansas City, MO
January 5, 1963		Missouri	W 84–78	5–7 (1–0)	McCasland Field House; Norman, OK
January 7, 1963		at Iowa State	W 91–85	6–7 (2–0)	McCasland Field House; Norman, OK
January 23, 1963		at Oklahoma State; Bedlam Series	L 62–81	6–8 (2–1)	Gallagher Hall; Stillwater, OK
January 26, 1963		at Iowa State	L 69–77	7–8 (2–2)	Iowa State Armory; Ames, IA
January 29, 1963		Kansas State	W 81–75	7–9 (3–2)	McCasland Field House; Norman, OK
February 2, 1963		No. 8 Colorado	L 68–77	7–10 (3–3)	McCasland Field House; Norman, OK
February 5, 1963		Kansas	L 55–86	7–11 (3–4)	McCasland Field House; Norman, OK
February 9, 1963		at Kansas State	L 69–100	7–12 (3–5)	Ahearn Fieldhouse; Manhattan, KS
February 11, 1963		at No. 7 Colorado	L 60–71	7–13 (3–6)	Balch Fieldhouse; Boulder, CO
February 16, 1963		at Kansas	W 64–62	8–13 (4–6)	Allen Fieldhouse; Lawrence, KS
February 18, 1963		Nebraska	W 84–77	9–13 (5–6)	McCasland Field House; Norman, OK
February 23, 1963		at Missouri	W 68–67	10–13 (6–6)	Brewer Fieldhouse; Columbia, MO
March 2, 1963		at Nebraska	W 77–75	11–13 (7–6)	Nebraska Coliseum; Lincoln, NE
March 5, 1963		Oklahoma State; Bedlam Series	W 70–65	12–13 (8–6)	McCasland Field House; Norman, OK
*Non-conference game. ^{#}Rankings from AP Poll. (#) Tournament seedings in parentheses. All times are in Central Time..

== 1963–64 season ==
1963–64 Oklahoma Sooners men's basketball
- Conference: Big Eight Conference
- Record: 7–18 (3–11 Big Eight)
- Head coach: Bob Stevens (2nd season)
- Home arena: McCasland Field House

1963–64 Big Eight Conference men's basketball standings
	Conf.				Overall
Team	W		L	PCT	W		L	PCT
Kansas State	12	–	2	.857	22	–	7	.759
Colorado	9	–	5	.643	15	–	10	.600
Kansas	8	–	6	.571	13	–	12	.520
Oklahoma State	7	–	7	.500	15	–	10	.600
Missouri	7	–	7	.500	13	–	11	.542
Iowa State	5	–	9	.357	9	–	16	.360
Nebraska	5	–	9	.357	7	–	18	.280
Oklahoma	3	–	11	.214	7	–	18	.280
Rankings from AP Poll

The 1963–64 Oklahoma Sooners men's basketball team represented the University of Oklahoma in the 1963–64 NCAA University Division men's basketball season college basketball season as a member of the Big Eight Conference. They finished the season with a 7–18 overall record, and finished last in the Big Eight Conference with a 3–11 conference record. They were coached by Bob Stevens in his second season as head coach of the Sooners. They played their home games at McCasland Field House in Norman, Oklahoma.

=== Schedule ===
Date time, TV	Rank^{#}	Opponent^{#}	Result	Record	Site city, state
Regular season
December 3, 1963*		South Dakota	W 100–79	1–0	McCasland Field House; Norman, OK
December 7, 1963*		SMU	L 72–83	1–1	McCasland Field House; Norman, OK
December 9, 1963*		Illinois	W 105–104	2–1	McCasland Field House; Norman, OK
December 14, 1963*		Texas	L 78–81	2–2	McCasland Field House; Norman, OK
December 17, 1963*		at Texas Tech	L 66–95	2–3	Lubbock Municipal Coliseum; Lubbock, TX
December 20, 1963*		at Arizona State	L 95–127	2–4	Sun Devil Gym; Tempe, AZ
December 21, 1963*		vs. Michigan State	L 100–118	2–5	Sun Devil Gym; Tempe, AZ
December 27, 1963		vs. Missouri; Big Eight Holiday Tournament	L 88–95	2–6	Municipal Auditorium; Kansas City, MO
December 28, 1963		vs. Nebraska; Big Eight Holiday Tournament	W 75–66	3–6	Municipal Auditorium; Kansas City, MO
December 30, 1963		vs. Iowa State; Big Eight Holiday Tournament	W 82–79	4–6	Municipal Auditorium; Kansas City, MO
January 4, 1964		Kansas	W 65–63 ^{OT}	5–6 (1–0)	McCasland Field House; Norman, OK
January 6, 1964		at Missouri	L 74–84	5–7 (1–1)	Brewer Fieldhouse; Columbia, MO
January 11, 1964		Oklahoma State; Bedlam Series	L 56–67	5–8 (1–2)	McCasland Field House; Norman, OK
January 25, 1964		at Iowa State	L 77–87	5–9 (1–3)	Iowa State Armory; Ames, IA
January 27, 1964		Kansas State	L 91–97	5–10 (1–4)	McCasland Field House; Norman, OK
February 1, 1964		Colorado	L 77–90	5–11 (1–5)	McCasland Field House; Norman, OK
February 3, 1964		Iowa State	L 73–78	5–12 (1–6)	McCasland Field House; Norman, OK
February 8, 1964		at Nebraska	L 69–76 ^{2 OT}	5–13 (1–7)	Nebraska Coliseum; Lincoln, NE
February 10, 1964		at Colorado	L 65–86	5–14 (1–8)	Balch Fieldhouse; Boulder, CO
February 15, 1964		at Kansas	L 72–84	5–15 (1–9)	Allen Fieldhouse; Lawrence, KS
February 17, 1964*		Bradley	L 78–80	5–16	McCasland Field House; Norman, OK
February 21, 1964		Missouri	W 86–84	6–16 (2–9)	McCasland Field House; Norman, OK
February 29, 1964		at Kansas State	L 70–99	6–17 (2–10)	Ahearn Field House; Manhattan, KS
March 2, 1964		Nebraska	W 82–76	7–17 (3–10)	McCasland Field House; Norman, OK
March 9, 1964		at Oklahoma State; Bedlam Series	L 47–80	7–18 (3–11)	Gallagher Hall; Stillwater, OK
*Non-conference game. ^{#}Rankings from AP Poll. (#) Tournament seedings in parentheses. All times are in Central Time..

== 1964–65 season ==
1964–65 Oklahoma Sooners men's basketball
- Conference: Big Eight Conference
- Record: 8–17 (3–11 Big Eight)
- Head coach: Bob Stevens (3rd season)
- Home arena: McCasland Field House

1964–65 Big Eight Conference men's basketball standings
	Conf.				Overall
Team	W		L	PCT	W		L	PCT
Oklahoma State	12	–	2	.857	20	–	7	.741
Kansas	9	–	5	.643	17	–	8	.680
Missouri	8	–	6	.571	13	–	11	.542
Colorado	8	–	6	.571	13	–	12	.520
Iowa State	6	–	8	.429	9	–	16	.360
Kansas State	5	–	9	.357	12	–	13	.480
Nebraska	5	–	9	.357	10	–	15	.400
Oklahoma	3	–	11	.214	8	–	17	.320
Rankings from AP Poll

The 1964–65 Oklahoma Sooners men's basketball team represented the University of Oklahoma in the 1964–65 NCAA University Division men's basketball season college basketball season as a member of the Big Eight Conference. They finished the season with an 8–17 overall record, and finished last in the Big Eight Conference with a 3–11 conference record. They were coached by Bob Stevens in his third season as head coach of the Sooners. They played their home games at McCasland Field House in Norman, Oklahoma.

=== Schedule ===
Date time, TV	Rank^{#}	Opponent^{#}	Result	Record	Site city, state
Regular season
December 4, 1964*		No. 15 Seattle	L 81–98	0–1	McCasland Field House; Norman, OK
December 7, 1964*		at Indiana	L 69–87	0–2	New Fieldhouse; Bloomington, IN
December 12, 1964*		at Texas	W 86–73	1–2	Gregory Gymnasium; Austin, TX
December 14, 1964*		Hardin–Simmons	W 78–67	2–2	McCasland Field House; Norman, OK
December 16, 1964*		Texas Tech	W 85–79	3–2	McCasland Field House; Norman, OK
December 21, 1964*		at Bradley	L 75–83	3–3	Robertson Memorial Field House; Peoria, IL
December 26, 1964		vs. Kansas State; Big Eight Holiday Tournament	L 65–75	3–4	Municipal Auditorium; Kansas City, MO
December 28, 1964		vs. Iowa State; Big Eight Holiday Tournament	W 76–72	4–4	Municipal Auditorium; Kansas City, MO
December 30, 1964		vs. Oklahoma State; Big Eight Holiday Tournament/Bedlam Series	L 46–65	4–5	Municipal Auditorium; Kansas City, MO
January 4, 1965		at Kansas State	L 69–71	4–6 (0–1)	Ahearn Field House; Manhattan, KS
January 9, 1965		Iowa State	L 81–87	4–7 (0–2)	McCasland Field House; Norman, OK
January 11, 1965		Nebraska	W 89–82	5–7 (1–2)	McCasland Field House; Norman, OK
January 23, 1965*		Northern Michigan	L 74–75	5–8	McCasland Field House; Norman, OK
January 25, 1965		at Iowa State	L 81–87	5–9 (1–3)	Iowa State Armory; Ames, IA
January 30, 1965		Colorado	L 70–71	5–10 (1–4)	McCasland Field House; Norman, OK
February 1, 1965		Missouri	W 87–74	6–10 (2–4)	McCasland Field House; Norman, OK
February 6, 1965		at Kansas	L 68–77	6–11 (2–5)	Allen Fieldhouse; Lawrence, KS
February 8, 1965		at Colorado	L 70–71	6–12 (2–6)	McCasland Field House; Norman, OK
February 13, 1965		Kansas	L 57–74	6–13 (2–7)	McCasland Field House; Norman, OK
February 15, 1965		Kansas State	W 80–65	7–13 (3–7)	McCasland Field House; Norman, OK
February 20, 1965		at Missouri	L 82–89	7–14 (3–8)	Brewer Fieldhouse; Columbia, MO
February 23, 1965		at Oklahoma State; Bedlam Series	L 54–64	7–15 (3–9)	Gallagher Hall; Stillwater, OK
February 27, 1965		at Nebraska	L 63–67	7–16 (3–10)	Nebraska Coliseum; Lincoln, NE
March 4, 1965*		at Loyola (LA)	W 94–80	8–16	Loyola Field House; New Orleans, LA
March 8, 1965		Oklahoma State; Bedlam Series	L 66–89	8–17 (3–11)	McCasland Field House; Norman, OK
*Non-conference game. ^{#}Rankings from AP Poll. (#) Tournament seedings in parentheses. All times are in Central Time..

== 1965–66 season ==
1965–66 Oklahoma Sooners men's basketball
- Conference: Big Eight Conference
- Record: 11–14 (7–7 Big Eight)
- Head coach: Bob Stevens (4th season)
- Home arena: McCasland Field House

1965–66 Big Eight Conference men's basketball standings
	Conf.				Overall
Team	W		L	PCT	W		L	PCT
No. 4 Kansas	13	–	1	.929	23	–	4	.852
Nebraska	12	–	2	.857	20	–	5	.800
Kansas State	9	–	5	.643	14	–	11	.560
Oklahoma	7	–	7	.500	11	–	14	.440
Colorado	6	–	8	.429	12	–	13	.480
Iowa State	6	–	8	.429	11	–	14	.440
Oklahoma State	2	–	12	.143	4	–	21	.160
Missouri	1	–	13	.071	3	–	21	.125
Rankings from AP Poll

The 1965–66 Oklahoma Sooners men's basketball team represented the University of Oklahoma in the 1965–66 NCAA University Division men's basketball season college basketball season as a member of the Big Eight Conference. They finished the season with a 11–14 overall record, and finished fourth in the Big Eight Conference with a 7–7 conference record. They were coached by Bob Stevens in his fourth season as head coach of the Sooners. They played their home games at McCasland Field House in Norman, Oklahoma.

=== Schedule ===
Date time, TV	Rank^{#}	Opponent^{#}	Result	Record	Site city, state
Regular season
December 1, 1965*		at Oklahoma City	L 71–74	0–1	Frederiksen Field House; Oklahoma City, OK
December 4, 1965*		Indiana	W 83–82	1–1	McCasland Field House; Norman, OK
December 7, 1965*		at SMU	L 78–89	1–2	Moody Coliseum; Dallas, TX
December 11, 1965*		No. 9 Bradley	L 80–81	1–3	McCasland Field House; Norman, OK
December 14, 1965*		at Texas Tech	L 92–100	1–4	Lubbock Municipal Coliseum; Lubbock, TX
December 20, 1965*		California	W 94–72	2–4	McCasland Field House; Norman, OK
December 23, 1965*		Butler	L 63–65	2–5	McCasland Field House; Norman, OK
December 27, 1965		vs. Oklahoma State; Big Eight Holiday Tournament/Bedlam Series	W 58–36	3–5	Municipal Auditorium; Kansas City, MO
December 29, 1965		vs. Nebraska; Big Eight Holiday Tournament	L 79–92	3–6	Municipal Auditorium; Kansas City, MO
December 30, 1965*		Iowa State; Big Eight Holiday Tournament	L 82–87	3–7	Municipal Auditorium; Kansas City, MO
January 3, 1966		Oklahoma State; Bedlam Series	W 64–53	4–7 (1–0)	McCasland Field House; Norman, OK
January 8, 1966		Colorado	W 64–58	5–7 (2–0)	McCasland Field House; Norman, OK
January 10, 1966		at No. 10 Kansas	L 68–89	5–8 (2–1)	Allen Fieldhouse; Lawrence, KS
January 22, 1966		at Nebraska	L 78–86	5–9 (2–2)	Nebraska Coliseum; Lincoln, NE
January 29, 1966		Missouri	W 88–70	6–9 (3–2)	McCasland Field House; Norman, OK
January 31, 1966		Iowa State	L 82–92	6–10 (3–3)	McCasland Field House; Norman, OK
February 5, 1966		at Kansas State	L 73–84	6–11 (3–4)	Ahearn Field House; Manhattan, KS
February 7, 1966		No. 9 Nebraska	L 81–85	6–12 (3–5)	McCasland Field House; Norman, OK
February 12, 1966		at Missouri	W 103–89	7–12 (4–5)	Brewer Fieldhouse; Columbia, MO
February 15, 1966*		Loyola (LA)	W 69–44	8–12	McCasland Field House; Norman, OK
February 19, 1966		at Iowa State	W 80–78	9–12 (5–5)	Iowa State Armory; Ames, IA
February 21, 1966		No. 6 Kansas	L 69–86	9–13 (5–6)	McCasland Field House; Norman, OK
February 26, 1966		Kansas State	W 80–77	10–13 (6–6)	McCasland Field House; Norman, OK
February 28, 1966		at Colorado	L 77–92	10–14 (6–7)	Balch Fieldhouse; Boulder, CO
March 5, 1966		at Oklahoma State	W 69–53	11–14 (7–7)	Gallagher-Iba Arena; Stillwater, OK
*Non-conference game. ^{#}Rankings from AP Poll. (#) Tournament seedings in parentheses. All times are in Central Time..

== 1966–67 season ==
1966–67 Oklahoma Sooners men's basketball
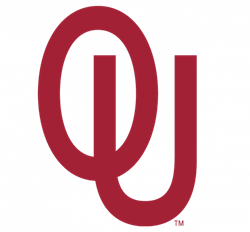
- Conference: Big Eight Conference
- Record: 8–17 (5–9 Big Eight)
- Head coach: Bob Stevens (5th season)
- Home arena: McCasland Field House

The 1966–67 Oklahoma Sooners men's basketball team represented the University of Oklahoma in the 1966–67 NCAA University Division men's basketball season college basketball season as a member of the Big Eight Conference. They finished the season with an 8–7 overall record, and finished sixth in the Big Eight Conference with a 5–9 conference record. They were coached by Bob Stevens in his fifth season as head coach of the Sooners. They played their home games at McCasland Field House in Norman, Oklahoma.

1966–67 Big Eight Conference men's basketball standings
	Conf.				Overall
Team	W		L	PCT	W		L	PCT
No. 3 Kansas	13	–	1	.929	23	–	4	.852
Colorado	10	–	4	.714	17	–	8	.680
Nebraska	10	–	4	.714	16	–	9	.640
Kansas State	9	–	5	.643	17	–	8	.680
Iowa State	6	–	8	.429	13	–	12	.520
Oklahoma	5	–	9	.357	8	–	17	.320
Oklahoma State	2	–	12	.143	7	–	18	.280
Missouri	1	–	13	.071	3	–	22	.120
Rankings from AP Poll

=== Schedule ===
Date time, TV	Rank^{#}	Opponent^{#}	Result	Record	Site city, state
Regular season
December 1, 1966		TCU	W 90–76	1–0	McCasland Field House; Norman, OK
December 3, 1966*		at Seattle	L 79–88	1–1	Key Arena; Seattle, WA
December 5, 1966*		at California	L 81–108	1–2	Harmon Gym; Norman, OK
December 13, 1966*		Texas Tech	W 94–79	2–2	McCasland Field House; Norman, OK
December 17, 1966*		North Texas State	L 78–86	2–3	McCasland Field House; Norman, OK
December 20, 1966*		Bradley	L 88–114	2–4	Robertson Memorial Field House; Peoria, IL
December 28, 1966		vs. Missouri; Big Eight Holiday Tournament	W 76–67	3–4	Municipal Auditorium; Kansas City, MO
December 29, 1966		vs. Kansas; Big Eight Holiday Tournament	L 73–97	3–5	Municipal Auditorium; Kansas City, MO
December 30, 1966		vs. Kansas State	L 76–102	3–6	Municipal Auditorium; Kansas City, MO
January 7, 1967		at No. 9 Kansas	L 73–97	3–7 (0–1)	Allen Fieldhouse; Lawrence, KS
January 9, 1967		Nebraska	W 99–87	4–7 (1–1)	McCasland Field House; Norman, OK
January 21, 1967*		Hardin–Simmons	L 83–94	4–8	McCasland Field House; Norman, OK
January 26, 1967		at Nebraska	L 78–97	4–9 (1–2)	Nebraska Coliseum; Lincoln, NE
January 28, 1967		at Iowa State	L 87–93	4–10 (1–3)	Iowa State Armory; Ames, IA
January 30, 1967		Kansas State	L 82–102	4–11 (1–4)	McCasland Field House; Norman, OK
February 4, 1967		Colorado	W 71–66	5–11 (2–4)	McCasland Field House; Norman, OK
February 7, 1967		at Missouri	W 75–65	6–11 (3–4)	Brewer Fieldhouse; Columbia, MO
February 11, 1967		Oklahoma State; Bedlam Series	W 67–60	7–11 (4–4)	McCasland Field House; Norman, OK
February 13, 1967*		Drake	L 73–76	7–12	McCasland Field House; Norman, OK
February 18, 1967		No. 6 Kansas	L 74–82	7–13 (4–5)	McCasland Field House; Norman, OK
February 20, 1967		at Colorado	L 73–83	7–14 (4–6)	Balch Fieldhouse; Boulder, CO
February 27, 1967		at Kansas State	L 71–84	7–15 (4–7)	Ahearn Fieldhouse; Manhattan, KS
March 4, 1967		Iowa State	L 63–69	7–16 (4–8)	McCasland Field House; Norman, OK
March 6, 1967		Missouri	W 90–75	8–16 (5–8)	McCasland Field House; Norman, OK
March 11, 1967		Oklahoma State	L 63–65	8–17 (5–9)	Gallagher Hall; Stillwater, OK
*Non-conference game. ^{#}Rankings from AP Poll. (#) Tournament seedings in parentheses. All times are in Central Time..

== 1967–68 season ==
1967–68 Oklahoma Sooners men's basketball
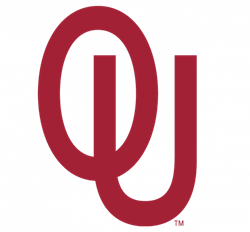
- Conference: Big Eight Conference
- Record: 13–13 (8–6 Big Eight)
- Head coach: John MacLeod (1st season)
- Home arena: McCasland Field House

1967–68 Big Eight Conference men's basketball standings
	Conf.				Overall
Team	W		L	PCT	W		L	PCT
Kansas State	11	–	3	.786	19	–	9	.679
Kansas	10	–	4	.714	22	–	8	.733
Nebraska	8	–	6	.571	15	–	10	.600
Oklahoma	8	–	6	.571	13	–	13	.500
Iowa State	8	–	6	.571	12	–	13	.480
Missouri	5	–	9	.357	10	–	16	.385
Oklahoma State	3	–	11	.214	10	–	16	.385
Colorado	3	–	11	.214	9	–	16	.360
Rankings from AP Poll

The 1967–68 Oklahoma Sooners men's basketball team represented the University of Oklahoma in the 1967–68 NCAA University Division men's basketball season college basketball season as a member of the Big Eight Conference. They finished the season with a 13–13 overall record, and finished tied for third in the Big Eight Conference with an 8–6 conference record. They were coached by John MacLeod in his first season as head coach of the Sooners. They played their home games at McCasland Field House in Norman, Oklahoma.

=== Schedule ===
Date time, TV	Rank^{#}	Opponent^{#}	Result	Record	Site city, state
Regular season
December 1, 1967*		Centenary	W 91–73	1–0	McCasland Field House; Norman, OK
December 4, 1967*		at TCU	W 66–57	2–0	Daniel–Meyer Coliseum; Fort Worth, TX
December 9, 1967*		Butler	W 79–75	3–0	McCasland Field House; Norman, OK
December 12, 1967*		at Texas Tech	L 67–74	3–1	Lubbock Municipal Coliseum; Lubbock, TX
December 15, 1967*		at USC	L 63–76	3–2	Los Angeles Memorial Sports Arena; Los Angeles, CA
December 16, 1967*		at Loyola Marymount	L 76–94	3–3	Alumni Memorial Gymnasium; Los Angeles, CA
December 19, 1967*		Wyoming	L 71–82	3–4	McCasland Field House; Norman, OK
December 23, 1967*		at Drake	L 85–97	3–5	Veterans Memorial Auditorium; Des Moines, IA
December 27, 1967		vs. Nebraska; Big Eight Holiday Tournament	L 65–75	3–6	Municipal Auditorium; Kansas City, MO
December 29, 1967		vs. Kansas; Big Eight Holiday Tournament	L 57–73	3–7	Municipal Auditorium; Kansas City, MO
December 30, 1967		vs. Iowa State; Big Eight Holiday Tournament	W 76–61	4–7	Municipal Auditorium; Kansas City, MO
January 6, 1968		at Missouri	W 71–70	5–7 (1–0)	Brewer Fieldhouse; Columbia, MO
January 9, 1968		Oklahoma State; Bedlam Series	W 61–58	6–7 (2–0)	McCasland Field House; Norman, OK
January 25, 1968		at Iowa State	L 70–80	6–8 (2–1)	Iowa State Armory; Ames, IA
January 27, 1968		at Nebraska	L 90–110	6–9 (2–2)	Nebraska Coliseum; Lincoln, NE
January 29, 1968		Kansas State	W 73–62	7–9 (3–2)	McCasland Field House; Norman, OK
February 3, 1968		at Kansas	L 70–72	7–10 (3–3)	Allen Fieldhouse; Lawrence, KS
February 5, 1968		Nebraska	L 83–89	7–11 (3–4)	McCasland Field House; Norman, OK
February 10, 1968		Iowa State	W 87–68	8–11 (4–4)	McCasland Field House; Norman, OK
February 13, 1968*		Southwestern Louisiana	W 63–62	9–11	McCasland Field House; Norman, OK
February 17, 1968		at Kansas State	L 48–72	9–12 (4–5)	Ahearn Field House; Manhattan, KS
February 19, 1968		Colorado	W 71–68	10–12 (5–5)	McCasland Field House; Norman, OK
February 24, 1968		at Oklahoma State; Bedlam Series	W 56–53	11–12 (6–5)	Gallagher Hall; Stillwater, OK
March 2, 1968		Missouri	W 76–72	12–12 (7–5)	McCasland Field House; Norman, OK
March 4, 1968		Kansas	L 80–85 ^{OT}	12–13 (7–6)	McCasland Field House; Norman, OK
March 7, 1968		at Colorado	W 84–78	13–13 (8–6)	Balch Fieldhouse; Boulder, CO
*Non-conference game. ^{#}Rankings from AP Poll. (#) Tournament seedings in parentheses. All times are in Central Time..

=== After the season ===
==== NBA draft ====
The following Sooners were selected in the 1968 NBA draft.

Round	Pick	Player	Position	NBA club
3	29	Don Sidle	Center	San Francisco Warriors
8	71	Willie Rogers	Forward	Seattle SuperSonics

== 1968–69 season ==
1968–69 Oklahoma Sooners men's basketball
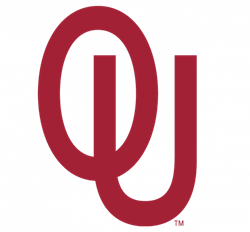
- Conference: Big Eight Conference
- Record: 7–19 (3–11 Big Eight)
- Head coach: John MacLeod (2nd season)
- Home arena: McCasland Field House

1968–69 Big Eight Conference men's basketball standings
	Conf.				Overall
Team	W		L	PCT	W		L	PCT
No. 18 Colorado	10	–	4	.714	21	–	7	.750
No. 19 Kansas	9	–	5	.643	20	–	7	.741
Kansas State	9	–	5	.643	14	–	12	.538
Iowa State	8	–	6	.571	14	–	12	.538
Missouri	7	–	7	.500	14	–	11	.560
Oklahoma State	5	–	9	.357	12	–	13	.480
Nebraska	5	–	9	.357	12	–	14	.462
Oklahoma	3	–	11	.214	7	–	19	.269
Rankings from AP Poll

The 1968–69 Oklahoma Sooners men's basketball team represented the University of Oklahoma in the 1968–69 NCAA University Division men's basketball season college basketball season as a member of the Big Eight Conference. They finished the season with a 7–19 overall record, and finished last in the Big Eight Conference with an 3–11 conference record. They were coached by John MacLeod in his second season as head coach of the Sooners. They played their home games at McCasland Field House in Norman, Oklahoma.

=== Schedule ===
Date time, TV	Rank^{#}	Opponent^{#}	Result	Record	Site city, state
Regular season
December 2, 1968*		at Centenary	W 45–38	1–0	Haynes Gymnasium; Shreveport, LA
December 6, 1968*		UNLV	L 84–93	1–1	McCasland Field House; Norman, OK
December 9, 1968*		Texas Tech	W 83–74	2–1	McCasland Field House; Norman, OK
December 13, 1968*		at Tennessee	L 49–55	2–2	Stokely Athletic Center; Knoxville, TN
December 14, 1968*		vs. Texas	L 46–65	2–3	Stokley Center; Knoxville, TN
December 19, 1968*		USC	L 46–48	2–4	McCasland Field House; Norman, OK
December 21, 1968*		at Wyoming	L 43–86	2–5	War Memorial Fieldhouse; Laramie, WY
December 23, 1968*		at Southwest Missouri State	W 65–57	3–5	McCasland Field House; Norman, OK
December 26, 1968		vs. Colorado; Big Eight Holiday Tournament	L 56–63	3–6	Municipal Auditorium; Kansas City, MO
December 28, 1968		vs. Nebraska; Big Eight Holiday Tournament	L 48–70	3–7	Municipal Auditorium; Kansas City, MO
December 30, 1968		vs. Iowa State; Big Eight Holiday Tournament	L 62–67	3–8	Municipal Auditorium; Kansas City, MO
January 4, 1968		Colorado	L 56–80	3–9 (0–1)	McCasland Field House; Norman, OK
January 6, 1969		Missouri	W 62–58	4–9 (1–1)	McCasland Field House; Norman, OK
January 11, 1969		at Kansas State	L 62–87	4–10 (1–2)	McCasland Field House; Norman, OK
January 25, 1969		UT Arlington	W 89–57	5–10	McCasland Field House; Norman, OK
February 1, 1969		at Iowa State	L 62–67	5–11 (1–3)	McCasland Field House; Norman, OK
February 3, 1969		at Nebraska	L 83–90	5–12 (1–4)	Nebraska Coliseum; Lincoln, NE
February 8, 1969		at No. 13 Kansas	L 59–66	5–13 (1–5)	McCasland Field House; Norman, OK
February 10, 1969		at No. 14 Colorado	L 69–92 ^{OT}	5–14 (1–6)	McCasland Field House; Norman, OK
February 15, 1969		at Oklahoma State	L 52–55	5–15 (1–7)	Gallagher-Iba Arena; Stillwater, OK
February 17, 1969		Kansas State	L 59–69	5–16 (1–8)	McCasland Field House; Norman, OK
February 22, 1969		at Missouri	L 49–69	5–17 (1–9)	Brewer Fieldhouse; Columbia, MO
February 24, 1969		at No. 13 Kansas	L 58–83	5–18 (1–10)	Allen Fieldhouse; Lawrence, KS
March 1, 1969		Oklahoma State; Bedlam Series	W 61–59 ^{OT}	6–18 (2–10)	McCasland Field House; Norman, OK
March 6, 1969		Iowa State	W 84–78	7–18 (3–10)	McCasland Field House; Norman, OK
March 8, 1969		Nebraska	L 64–70	7–19 (3–11)	McCasland Field House; Norman, OK
*Non-conference game. ^{#}Rankings from AP Poll. (#) Tournament seedings in parentheses. All times are in Central Time..
