= 1968–69 Iowa State Cyclones men's basketball team =

American college basketball season

1968–69 Iowa State Cyclones men's basketball
- Conference: Big Eight Conference
- Record: 14–12 (8–6 Big Eight)
- Head coach: Glen Anderson (10th season)
- Assistant coach: Arnie Gaarde
- Home arena: Iowa State Armory

1968–69 Big Eight Conference men's basketball standings
	Conf.				Overall
Team	W		L	PCT	W		L	PCT
No. 18 Colorado	10	–	4	.714	21	–	7	.750
No. 19 Kansas	9	–	5	.643	20	–	7	.741
Kansas State	9	–	5	.643	14	–	12	.538
Iowa State	8	–	6	.571	14	–	12	.538
Missouri	7	–	7	.500	14	–	11	.560
Oklahoma State	5	–	9	.357	12	–	13	.480
Nebraska	5	–	9	.357	12	–	14	.462
Oklahoma	3	–	11	.214	7	–	19	.269
Rankings from AP Poll

The 1968–69 Iowa State Cyclones men's basketball team represented Iowa State University during the 1968–69 NCAA Division I men's basketball season. The Cyclones were coached by Glen Anderson, who was in his tenth season with the Cyclones. They played their home games at the Iowa State Armory in Ames, Iowa.

They finished the season 14–12, 8–6 in Big Eight play to finish in fourth place.

== Roster ==
1968–69 Iowa State Cyclones men's basketball team
Players
Coaches

Pos.	#	Name	Height	Weight	Year	Hometown
G		Jim Abrahamson	6 ft 0 in (1.83 m)	—	Jr
F		Bill Cain	6 ft 7 in (2.01 m)	—	Jr
F		Dave Collins	6 ft 2 in (1.88 m)	—	Jr
G		Jack DeVilder	6 ft 3 in (1.91 m)	—	So
G		Tom Goodman (C)	5 ft 10 in (1.78 m)	—	Sr
F		Bob Hannan	6 ft 10 in (2.08 m)	—	Jr
F		Aaron Jenkins	6 ft 3 in (1.91 m)	—	Jr
F		Ron Kaufman	6 ft 5 in (1.96 m)	—	Jr
F		Tom Kreamer (C)	6 ft 5 in (1.96 m)	—	Sr
G		Don McLaughlin	6 ft 3 in (1.91 m)	—	So
G		Mike Murray	6 ft 1 in (1.85 m)	—	Jr
F		Tom Pyle (C)	6 ft 3 in (1.91 m)	—	Sr
		Otto Stowe	—	—

Head coach

- Glen Anderson

Assistant coach(es)

Arnie Gaarde

Legend

- (C) Team captain
- (S) Suspended
- (I) Ineligible
- (W) Walk-on
- Injured
- Current redshirt

== Schedule and results ==
Date time, TV	Rank^{#}	Opponent^{#}	Result	Record	Site city, state
Regular season
November 30, 1968*; 8:00 pm		at Minnesota	W 57–48	1–0	Williams Arena; Minneapolis
December 2, 1968*; 7:35 pm		Hardin–Simmons	W 84–83	2–0	Iowa State Armory; Ames, Iowa
December 4, 1968*; 7:30 pm		at No. 20 Tennessee	W 72–66	3–0	Stokely Center; Knoxville, Tennessee
December 7, 1968*; 7:35 pm		South Dakota State	W 94–61	4–0	Iowa State Armory; Ames, Iowa
December 9, 1968*; 7:35 pm		San Fernando State	W 97–61	5–0	Iowa State Armory; Ames, Iowa
December 14, 1968*; 1:30 pm		at Illinois	L 48–75	5–1	Assembly Hall (10,051); Champaign, Illinois
December 16, 1968*; 7:30 pm		at Northern Illinois	L 65–78	5–2	Chick Evans Fieldhouse; DeKalb, Illinois
December 19, 1968*; 8:05 pm, WOI		Drake; Iowa Big Four	L 71–81	5–3	Iowa State Armory; Ames, Iowa
December 27, 1968*; 9:00 pm		vs. Kansas State; Big Eight Holiday Tournament Quarterfinals	L 66–79	5–4	Municipal Auditorium; Kansas City, Missouri
December 28, 1968*; 3:00 pm		vs. Missouri; Big Eight Holiday Tournament Consolation Semifinals	L 68–80	5–5	Municipal Auditorium; Kansas City, Missouri
December 30, 1968*; 1:00 pm		vs. Oklahoma; Big Eight Holiday Tournament Seventh Place	W 67–62	6–5	Municipal Auditorium; Kansas City, Missouri
January 4, 1969; 7:35 pm, WOI (delay)		Kansas State	L 65–75	6–6 (0–1)	Iowa State Armory; Ames, Iowa
January 6, 1969; 8:05 pm		at No. 5 Kansas	L 61–94	6–7 (0–2)	Allen Fieldhouse; Lawrence, Kansas
January 11, 1969; 9:05 pm		at Colorado	L 67–68	6–8 (0–3)	Balch Fieldhouse; Boulder, Colorado
January 13, 1969; 7:35 pm, WOI (delay)		No. 5 Kansas	W 78–72 ^{2OT}	7–8 (1–3)	Iowa State Armory; Ames, Iowa
January 18, 1969; 2:10 pm, Big Eight		at Missouri	L 58–74	7–9 (1–4)	Brewer Fieldhouse; Columbia, Missouri
January 20, 1969; 7:35 pm, WOI (delay)		Oklahoma State	W 58–56	8–9 (2–4)	Iowa State Armory; Ames, Iowa
January 25, 1969; 2:10 pm, Big Eight		Nebraska	W 99–93 ^{OT}	9–9 (3–4)	Iowa State Armory; Ames, Iowa
February 1, 1969; 7:35 pm, WOI (delay)		Oklahoma	W 87–61	10–9 (4–4)	Iowa State Armory; Ames, Iowa
February 5, 1969*; 7:35 pm		at Drake; Iowa Big Four	L 71–94	10–10	Veterans Memorial Auditorium; Des Moines, Iowa
February 8, 1969; 7:30 pm		at Kansas State	L 73–78	10–11 (4–5)	Ahearn Fieldhouse; Manhattan, Kansas
February 15, 1969; 7:35 pm		at Nebraska	W 75–74 ^{OT}	11–11 (5–5)	Nebraska Coliseum; Lincoln, Nebraska
February 17, 1969; 7:35 pm, WOI (delay)		Missouri	W 76–74 ^{OT}	12–11 (6–5)	Iowa State Armory; Ames, Iowa
February 22, 1969; 2:10 pm, Big Eight		No. 18 Colorado	W 80–76 ^{OT}	13–11 (7–5)	Iowa State Armory; Ames, Iowa
March 6, 1969; 7:35 pm		at Oklahoma	L 78–84	13–12 (7–6)	OU Field House; Norman, Oklahoma
March 8, 1969; 7:35 pm		at Oklahoma State	W 51–49	14–12 (8–6)	Gallagher Hall; Stillwater, Oklahoma
*Non-conference game. ^{#}Rankings from AP poll. (#) Tournament seedings in parentheses. All times are in Central Time.
