= Nolen Ellison =

American basketball player and educator (1941–2025)

- Born: Nolen M. Ellison; November 3, 1941; Kansas City, Kansas, U.S.
- Died: June 12, 2025 (aged 83)
- Education: University of Kansas; Michigan State University

Nolen M. Ellison (November 3, 1941 – June 12, 2025) was an American Big 8 basketball player and pioneering community college educator and administrator.

== Early life ==
Ellison grew up in inner-city Kansas City, Kansas, with his older brother Benoyd M. (Butch) Ellison. Ellison graduated from Wyandotte High School in 1959. Ellison starred on three Kansas large class state championship teams (1957–1959) at Wyandotte High School under Coach Walter Shublom helping him to earn a basketball scholarship at the University of Kansas in 1959. Ellison was the first African-American player in the history of tradition-rich Wyandotte High School basketball.

== Basketball career ==
=== University of Kansas ===
Ellison attended the University of Kansas and played for the Kansas Jayhawks immediately after African-American pioneers Maurice King, Wilt Chamberlain, Bill Bridges, and Wayne Hightower. Ellison played three seasons at Kansas for Coach Dick Harp from the 1960–61 season through the 1962–63 season. Ellison earned All-Big 8 honors as the Jayhawks second leading scorer in both the 1961–62 season and 1962–63 seasons, while serving as team captain his senior season.

A career highlight for Ellison was a four-overtime 90–88 victory for Ellison and the Jayhawks versus rival Kansas State in the 1962 Big Eight Holiday Tournament championship game at Municipal Auditorium in Kansas City, Missouri on December 29, 1962. Ellison, who led the Jayhawks with 30 points in the game, scored the final Jayhawk points in each of the first three overtimes. Ellison made the final basket in the first overtime with 1:51 left to send the game into a second overtime. Kansas State held the ball after Ellison’s basket and missed a shot with 0:03 left. Ellison made two free throws with 4 seconds left in the second overtime to tie the game and send it to a third overtime. Ellison made two free throws with two seconds left in the third overtime to send it to the fourth. Ellison’s teammate Jay Roberts hit the game winner with two seconds left in the fourth overtime. Ellison graduated from the University of Kansas in 1963 with a Bachelor of Science degree in education.

=== Post-graduation ===
Upon graduation from the University of Kansas in 1963, Ellison was drafted in the 4th round (29th overall) of the 1963 NBA draft by the Baltimore Bullets. Ellison declined the professional basketball opportunity with the Zephyrs, but later participated with a college all-star team in a 1964 Olympic basketball tour in Asia.

== Academic career ==
Following graduation, Ellison began his career as a student teacher in the Shawnee Heights USD 450 school district in Topeka, Kansas, Ellison taught and coached at Sumner High School in Kansas City, KS from 1963 to 1967.

During his tenure at Sumner, Ellison was the first African-American elected to the Kansas City Junior College Board of Trustees. While serving in the role of a trustee, Ellison met a representative of the Kellogg Foundation who convinced him that he could become a community college president. This Kellogg Foundation connection led to a post-graduate scholarship at Michigan State University that Ellison utilized to enter a graduate education program at Michigan State's campus in East Lansing in 1969.

Ellison earned his Ph.D. in education/leadership management from Michigan State University in 1971. During his Ph.D. studies, Ellison served as Assistant to Michigan State University President Clifton R. Wharton Jr. from 1970 to 1971.

In the fall of 1971, Ellison was hired as assistant to the chancellor at Metropolitan Community College in Kansas City, Missouri, for the 1971–72 academic year.

After one year in Kansas City, Ellison returned in 1972 to Michigan State University as dean of students and assistant vice president of student affairs. Ellison was the first African-American to hold the dean of students position at Michigan State University.

In 1972, at the age of 31, Ellison was hired as president of Seattle Central Community College. At the time he was the youngest CEO of a higher education institution in Washington and one of the youngest in the United States. Ellison held the position until 1974.

In 1974, Ellison was hired to be the second President and CEO in the history of the Cuyahoga Community College in Cleveland, OH. At Cuyahoga Community College, Ellison was known as an educational innovator that pushed for the installation of computers on the campus. Ellison was also instrumental in the creation of the Tri-City Jazzfest Cleveland in 1980. Ellison held this position until 1991.

In June 1992, Ellison was hired at the University of Missouri-Kansas City as the Endowed Chair - Missouri Schutte Professor of Urban Affairs in the Henry W. Bloch School of Management. Ellison held this position until 2001.

After retiring from UMKC, Ellison returned to Kansas City Kansas Community College in 2007 (retiring in 2009) in a consulting role while also serving as a trustee of the college for the second time. Ellison became the first KCKCC trustee to serve two non-conjoining terms on the board.

== Personal life and death ==
Ellison's brother Butch, who attended Sumner High School and Kansas City Junior College, also joined the Kansas Jayhawk basketball program and played during the 1960–61 season. Ellison died on June 12, 2025, at the age of 83.

== Honors ==
During his tenure as president of Seattle Central Community College, Ellison was named by the U.S. Junior Chamber of Commerce as one of its "10 Outstanding Young Men of the Year".

In 1981, Phi Delta Kappa awarded Ellison as one of the "75 Outstanding Educational Leaders in the United States".

In 1983, Ellison was awarded a distinguished service citation by the University of Kansas Alumni Association during its commencement exercises on May 14–15, 1983.

In 1984, the Black Professionals Association Charitable Foundation named Ellison as a "Black Professional of the Year".

In 2004, Cuyahoga Community College named a new building, the Nolen M. Ellison Building-Unified Technologies Center, on its campus after Ellison.
