= Bob Stevens (basketball) =

American basketball coach

Biographical details
- Born: November 11, 1923
- Died: September 29, 2012 (aged 88)

Playing career
- 1947–1949: Michigan State
- Position: Forward

Coaching career (HC unless noted)
- 1954–1959: Michigan State (assistant)
- 1959–1962: South Carolina
- 1962–1967: Oklahoma

Head coaching record
- Overall: 80–124 (.392)

Accomplishments and honors

Awards
- ACC Coach of the Year (1962)

Robert Stevens (November 11, 1923 – September 29, 2012) was an American basketball coach. He was the head men's basketball coach at the University of South Carolina and the University of Oklahoma. From 1959–60 to 1966–67, he posted a combined 80–124 win–loss record at the two schools.

== Biography ==
Raised in Warsaw, Indiana, Stevens attended Sidney High School before going to college at the University of Michigan and Michigan State University; he played on the men's basketball team at Michigan State and graduated from the university in 1949. In World War II and the Korean War, Stevens served in the United States Marine Corps. He coached at Indiana's Milford High School before receiving his first collegiate job from Michigan State. Stevens spent three seasons coaching the university's freshman team, and was then promoted to an assistant position on the varsity team. After three seasons in that position, he was hired as head coach at South Carolina in 1959. The Gamecocks were 10–16 in 1959–60, Stevens' first head coaching season. Following 1960–61, a season in which the team had a 9–17 record, South Carolina improved to 15–12 in 1961–62, and Stevens earned the Atlantic Coast Conference Men's Basketball Coach of the Year award.

In April 1962, Stevens left South Carolina to become Oklahoma's men's basketball coach. In the five seasons that he coached the Sooners, the team did not post a winning record. Oklahoma's best record during this time came in Stevens' first season there, 1962–63, when the Sooners went 12–13. Reportedly "under pressure" after the 1966–67 season, Stevens resigned in April 1967. During his career, he was known for employing attacking, fast break offensive tactics. Later in his life, Stevens had a 20-year stint as leader of the Waterford Athletic Club, and was an assistant coach for the Continental Basketball Association's Oklahoma City Cavalry.

On September 29, 2012, Stevens died in a boating accident.

== Head coaching record ==
Record table
Season	Team	Overall	Conference	Standing	Postseason
South Carolina Gamecocks (Atlantic Coast Conference) (1959–1962)
1959–60	South Carolina	10–16	6–8	6th	
1960–61	South Carolina	9–17	2–12	T–7th	
1961–62	South Carolina	15–12	7–7	T–4th	
South Carolina:		34–45 (.430)	15–27 (.357)		
Oklahoma Sooners (Big Eight Conference) (1962–1967)
1962–63	Oklahoma	12–13	8–6	T–3rd	
1963–64	Oklahoma	7–18	3–11	8th	
1964–65	Oklahoma	8–17	3–11	8th	
1965–66	Oklahoma	11–14	7–7	4th	
1966–67	Oklahoma	8–17	5–9	6th	
Oklahoma:		46–79 (.368)	26–44 (.371)		
Total:		80–124 (.392)			
