= Ted Owens (basketball) =

American basketball coach (born 1929)

Biographical details
- Born: July 16, 1929 (age 97); Hollis, Oklahoma, U.S.
- Education: University of Oklahoma

Playing career
- 1948–1951: Oklahoma

Coaching career (HC unless noted)
- 1956–1960: Cameron Junior College
- 1960–1964: Kansas (assistant)
- 1964–1983: Kansas
- 1985–1987: Oral Roberts
- 1989–1990: Maccabi Tel Aviv
- 1990–1995: Metro Christian Academy HS

Administrative career (AD unless noted)
- 1995–1999: Saint Leo University

Head coaching record
- Overall: 369–218 (.628)
- Tournaments: 8–9 (NCAA Division I)

Accomplishments and honors

Championships
- 2 NCAA regional – Final Four (1971, 1974); Big Eight tournament (1981); 6 Big Eight regular season (1966, 1967, 1971, 1974, 1975, 1978)

Awards
- Basketball Weekly Coach of the Year (1978); 4x Big Eight Coach of the Year (1967, 1971, 1974, 1978)
- College Basketball Hall of Fame; Inducted in 2026

Ted Owens (born July 16, 1929) is an American former college basketball coach, who was born in Hollis, Oklahoma. He is best-known as the coach of the University of Kansas men's basketball team from 1964 to 1983. He is the fourth-winningest coach in Jayhawks basketball history.

== Player and early coaching experience ==
Owens attended college at the University of Oklahoma (OU), where he was a three-year letterman under head coach Bruce Drake. He graduated with a BA degree in 1951. In 1956, he was hired to coach both baseball and basketball at Cameron Junior College (Lawton, Oklahoma), where he remained until 1960. His baseball team won the National JC Championship in 1958. The basketball team had a 93–24 record during his four years and appeared in three NJCAA Tournaments.

Owens' overall Kansas record was 348–182 (.657), and his Big Eight Conference record was 170–96 (.639). In Owens' tenure at KU, he won six Big Eight Conference titles and advanced to the NCAA tournament seven times. His 1971 and 1974 teams made it to the Final Four, and in 1968 the Jayhawks lost to Dayton in the finals of the National Invitation Tournament. Owens was named Big Eight Conference Coach of the Year five times and was Named National Coach of the Year in 1978 by Basketball Weekly. He coached five All-Americans: Jo Jo White, Darnell Valentine, Dave Robisch, Bud Stallworth and Walt Wesley. He was fired following the 1982–83 season after the Jayhawks posted back-to-back losing seasons. He is the only coach in the program's history to be fired. Kansas has not suffered a losing season since, and has only missed the NCAA tournament once since then, in 1988–89 when the program was on probation for recruiting violations committed by Owens' successor, Larry Brown.

A three-year letterman at the University of Oklahoma (1949–51), Owens honed his coaching skills as head coach at Cameron State Junior College in Lawton, Oklahoma. In four seasons his teams never won fewer than 20 games and three times advanced to the NJCAA Men's Division I Basketball Championship semifinals. At Cameron, he amassed a 93–24 record and boasted four junior college All-Americans.

Owens then accepted an assistant's position under Dick Harp in 1960, and was promoted to head coach when Harp resigned following the 1963–64 season.

== Other coaching activities ==
Owens had a brief stint of coaching at Oral Roberts University (1985–87), and then in Israel with Maccabi Tel Aviv during the 1989–90 season, before being fired in February 1990. He then went on to be the development director and basketball coach at Metro Christian Academy (high school) in Tulsa, Oklahoma for five years where his teams won the district championship five times, and went to the state tournament three times. Subsequently, he moved on to be athletic director at St. Leo University in Florida for four years.

Owens was inducted into the Oklahoma Sports Hall of Fame on August 3, 2009. He was inducted into the Kansas Hall of Fame in the same year.

== Retirement ==
After leaving St. Leo, a friend invited him to return to Tulsa and work as an investment adviser for First Capital Management, where he spent the next ten years. After retiring from this position, he decided to continue living in Tulsa in retirement. He returned to Lawrence to coach on September 24, 2011, for the "Legends of the Phog" exhibition match, opposite Larry Brown, in which various Kansas alumni played an exhibition game during the 2011 NBA lockout.

== Head coaching record ==
Record table
Season	Team	Overall	Conference	Standing	Postseason
Kansas Jayhawks (Big Eight Conference) (1964–1983)
1964–65	Kansas	17–8	9–5	2nd	
1965–66	Kansas	23–4	13–1	1st	NCAA University Division Elite Eight
1966–67	Kansas	23–4	13–1	1st	NCAA University Division Regional Third Place
1967–68	Kansas	22–8	10–4	2nd	NIT Runner-up
1968–69	Kansas	20–7	9–5	T-2nd	NIT First Round
1969–70	Kansas	17–9	8–6	2nd	
1970–71	Kansas	27–3	14–0	1st	NCAA University Division Fourth Place
1971–72	Kansas	11–15	7–7	T-4th	
1972–73	Kansas	8–18	4–10	7th	
1973–74	Kansas	23–7	13–1	1st	NCAA Division I Fourth Place
1974–75	Kansas	19–8	11–3	1st	NCAA Division I First Round
1975–76	Kansas	13–13	6–8	T-4th	
1976–77	Kansas	18–10	8–6	4th	
1977–78	Kansas	24–5	13–1	1st	NCAA Division I First Round
1978–79	Kansas	18–11	8–6	T-2nd	
1979–80	Kansas	15–14	7–7	T-4th	
1980–81	Kansas	24–8	9–5	T-2nd	NCAA Division I Sweet 16
1981–82	Kansas	13–14	4–10	7th	
1982–83	Kansas	13–16	4–10	T-6th	
Kansas:		348–182 (.657)	170–96 (.639)		
Oral Roberts Titans (Midwestern City Conference) (1985–1987)
1985–86	Oral Roberts	10–19	5–7	5th	
1986–87	Oral Roberts	11–17	5–7	T-5th	
Oral Roberts:		21–36 (.368)	10–14 (.417)		
Total:		369–218 (.629)			
National champion Postseason invitational champion Conference regular season champion Conference regular season and conference tournament champion Division regular season champion Division regular season and conference tournament champion Conference tournament champion

== See also ==
- List of NCAA Division I Men's Final Four appearances by coach
