= Dick Harp =

American basketball coach (1918–2000)

Biographical details
- Born: March 28, 1918; Kansas City, Kansas, U.S.
- Died: March 18, 2000 (aged 81); Lawrence, Kansas, U.S.
- Education: University of Kansas

Playing career
- 1937-1940: Kansas

Coaching career (HC unless noted)
- 1946-1948: William Jewell
- 1949-1956: Kansas (Assistant)
- 1956-1964: Kansas
- 1986–1989: North Carolina (Assistant)

Head coaching record
- Overall: 121-107 (.570)
- Tournaments: 4-2 (NCAA Division I)

Accomplishments and honors

Championships
- NCAA Regional – Final Four (1957); Big 7 regular season (1957); Big 8 regular season (1960)

Awards
- Big Eight Coach of the Year (1960)

Richard F. Harp (March 28, 1918 – March 18, 2000) was an American college basketball coach who spent the majority of his career at the University of Kansas. He became the Kansas Jayhawks' fourth men's basketball coach in 1956. He coached for eight years until his resignation in 1964. Harp's overall Kansas record was 121–82 (.596) and conference record was 63–45 (.583).

Harp played high school basketball at Rosedale High School before being recruited by Phog Allen to play for Kansas. After gaining a wealth of knowledge as a player and assistant under Allen, Harp became the Jayhawks' head coach himself from 1956 to 1964. Harp compiled a 121–82 record in those eight seasons and led the Jayhawks to two conference titles (one Big Seven, one Big Eight Conference) and two NCAA tournament berths. In 1957, the Jayhawks captured the Midwest Regional and made it to the finals, only to be stopped by the University of North Carolina in a memorable 54–53 loss in triple overtime in Kansas City, Mo. Under his guidance, Wilt Chamberlain and Bill Bridges achieved All-American status. Chamberlain's relationship with Harp, however, was notably poor, fueled by resentment and disappointment: Chamberlain's biographer, Robert Cherry, has speculated that Chamberlain would not have chosen to attend Kansas if he had known that Harp's predecessor, Phog Allen, was going to retire in 1956.

Harp had served as Phog Allen's assistant for eight seasons before taking over for Allen in 1956. Prior to that Harp was head coach for two seasons at William Jewell College in Liberty, Missouri. Harp played basketball at KU, lettering from 1938 to 1940 and was one of the starting guards on the 1940 team that lost to Indiana University in the NCAA finals. Harp served as master sergeant in the US Army for four years during World War II. Harp served as the director of the Fellowship of Christian Athletes for 13 years after leaving the Jayhawks. Harp is one of only five people to have played and coached in an NCAA title game. He served as an assistant coach from 1986 to 1989 at North Carolina for Dean Smith – whom he coached as a player at Kansas when he was Allen's assistant.

== Head coaching record ==
Record table
| Season | Team | Overall | Conference | Standing | Postseason |
|---|---|---|---|---|---|
William Jewell Cardinals (Missouri College Athletic Union) (1946–1948)
| 1946–47 | William Jewell College | 11–10 | | | |
| 1947–48 | William Jewell College | 10–15 | | | |
| William Jewell College: | | 21–25 (.457) | | | |
Kansas Jayhawks (Big Seven/Big Eight Conference) (1956–1964)
| 1956–57 | Kansas | 24–3 | 11–1 | 1st | NCAA University Division Runner-up |
| 1957–58 | Kansas | 18–5 | 8–4 | T-2nd | |
| 1958–59 | Kansas | 11–14 | 8–6 | T-3rd | |
| 1959–60 | Kansas | 19–9 | 10–4 | T-1st | NCAA University Division Elite Eight |
| 1960–61 | Kansas | 17–8 | 10–4 | 2nd | |
| 1961–62 | Kansas | 7–18 | 3–11 | T-7th | |
| 1962–63 | Kansas | 12–13 | 5–9 | T-6th | |
| 1963–64 | Kansas | 13–12 | 8–6 | 3rd | |
| Kansas: | | 121–82 (.596) | 63–45 (.583) | | |
| Total: | | 142–107 (.570) | | | |
National champion Postseason invitational champion Conference regular season champion Conference regular season and conference tournament champion Division regular season champion Division regular season and conference tournament champion Conference tournament champion

== Personal life ==
Harp was married to Martha Sue Harp for 56 years, and the couple had a son, Rich. He lived in Lawrence, Kansas, until his death in March 2000. Harp's health had been failing for several years, and he had recently fractured a hip. He died at his residence at Lawrence's Presbyterian Manor.

== See also ==
- List of NCAA Division I Men's Final Four appearances by coach
