= McCasland Field House =

Indoor basketball court in Norman, Oklahoma

Coordinates: 35.208034°N 97.442535°W

T. Howard McCasland Field House
- The Field House
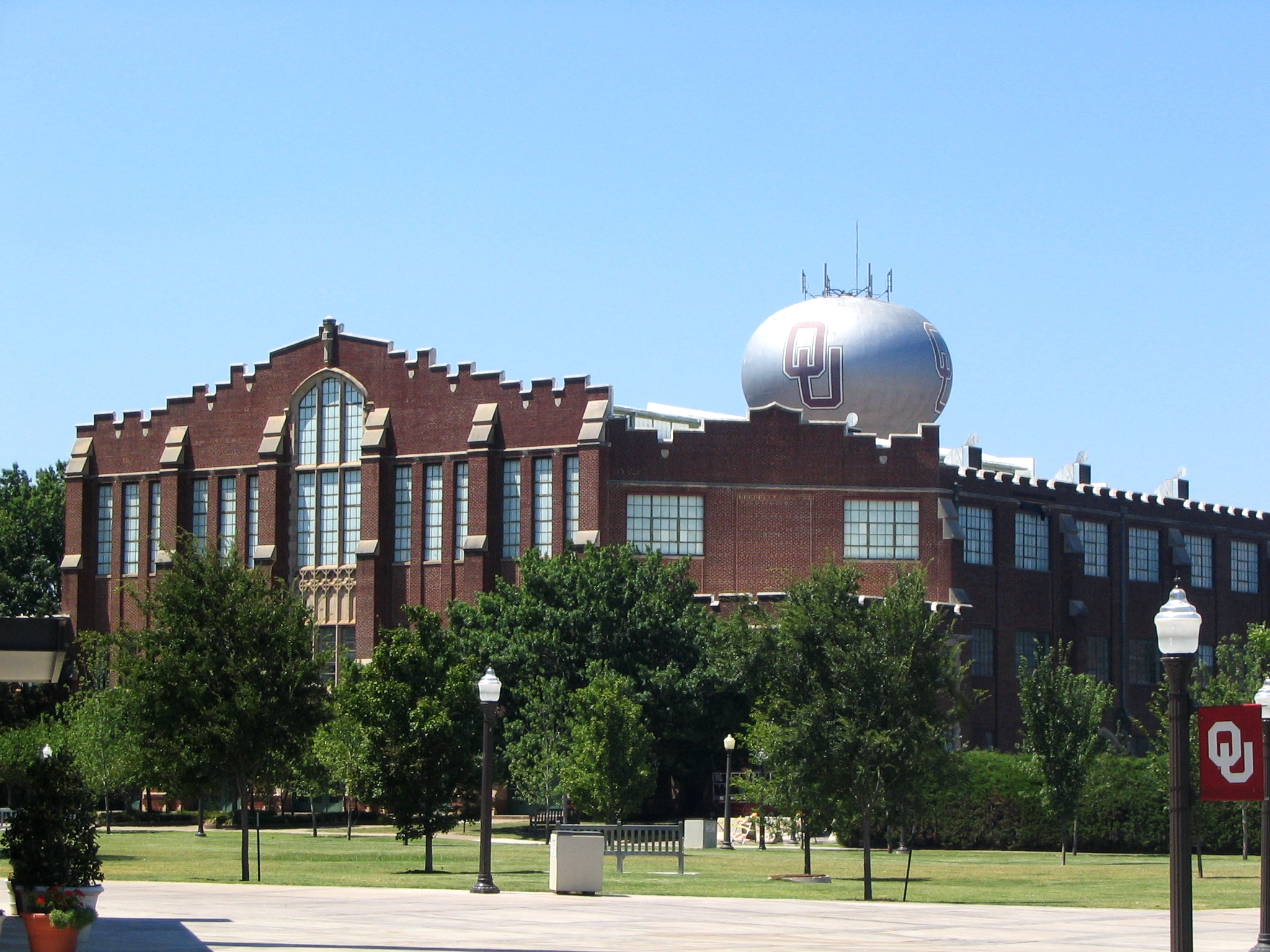
- Interactive map of T. Howard McCasland Field House
- Location: 151 West Brooks Street; Norman, Oklahoma
- Owner: University of Oklahoma
- Operator: University of Oklahoma
- Capacity: 3,325

Construction
- Opened: January 13, 1928

Tenants
- Oklahoma Sooners (NCAA); Men's basketball (1928–1975); Women's volleyball Men's wrestling Men's gymnastics

The McCasland Field House is a multi-purpose indoor arena on the University of Oklahoma main campus in Norman, Oklahoma. Home of Oklahoma Sooners men's basketball until 1975, the Field House currently hosts the men's wrestling, women's volleyball, and men's gymnastics teams. The Field House is named for T. Howard McCasland, a two-sport star who was the captain of the 1916 basketball team and an end for the football team.

The facility opened with a basketball game between the Sooners and the University of Kansas Jayhawks on January 13, 1928, which the Sooners won 45–19. When it opened, the facility held over 5,000 people.

The Field House hosted concerts by Jimi Hendrix, Ray Charles and Sonny & Cher in the 1960s.

As the campus was constructed around the Field House, parking for fans disappeared and attendance at games dwindled as well. After the Lloyd Noble Center opened in 1975 and the basketball teams moved south to the new facility, the Field House seemed forgotten and neglected.

Plans for refurbishment began in the 1990s along with other campus improvements, and fundraising began in earnest in September 1997. In 2005 the initial phase of a $6 million renovation project was completed, including the building's first-ever climate control system, refurbishment of the historic wood floor, new chair backs and retractable seats. The facility had to be completely rewired, not only to handle the new heating and air-conditioning systems and the new lighting and state-of-the-art sound and video systems, but to bring the building up to current electrical code standards.

The next phase of renovations to the Field House was locker room upgrades, additions of restrooms and concessions, and expansion of the wrestling practice facility from its current 4,500 square feet (420 m^{2}) to more than 8,000 square feet (740 m^{2}). Finally, all of the building's windows, a distinguishing feature of the Field House, were replaced, along with the roof.
