= Brewer Fieldhouse =

Multi-purpose arena in Columbia, Missouri

Coordinates: 38.941720°N 92.326527°W

- Interactive map of Brewer Fieldhouse
- Location: Columbia, Missouri
- Capacity: 5,000

Construction
- Opened: 1929
- Renovated: 2003
- Closed: 1972 (closed to men's basketball)
- Architects: Jamieson & Spearl

Tenant
- University of Missouri

The Brewer Fieldhouse was a multi-purpose arena on the campus of the University of Missouri in Columbia, Missouri. Built in 1929 to expand upon the 500-seat Rothwell Gymnasium, the structure was named for Chester Brewer and served as the home for the university's Tigers basketball team. In 1972, basketball games moved to the new Hearnes Center. The fieldhouse and gymnasium were converted into the Student Recreation Complex, which was renovated in 1987 and again in 2005.
