= Iowa State Armory =

Multi-purpose arena in Ames, Iowa

- Interactive map of Iowa State Armory
- Location: Osborn Dr & Bissell Rd; Ames, Iowa 50011
- Coordinates: 42.029611°N 93.650959°W
- Owner: Iowa State University
- Operator: Iowa State University
- Capacity: 7,500 (peak)

Construction
- Opened: 1923

Tenant
- Iowa State Cyclones men's basketball (1947-1971)

Iowa State Armory was a 7,500-seat multi-purpose arena in Ames, Iowa. It was home to the Iowa State University Cyclones basketball team until Hilton Coliseum opened in 1971. The main floor of the arena now serves as project space for the College of Design. Other tenants of the building include the Department of Public Safety as well as the Army, Navy, and Air Force ROTC.
