= Balch Fieldhouse =

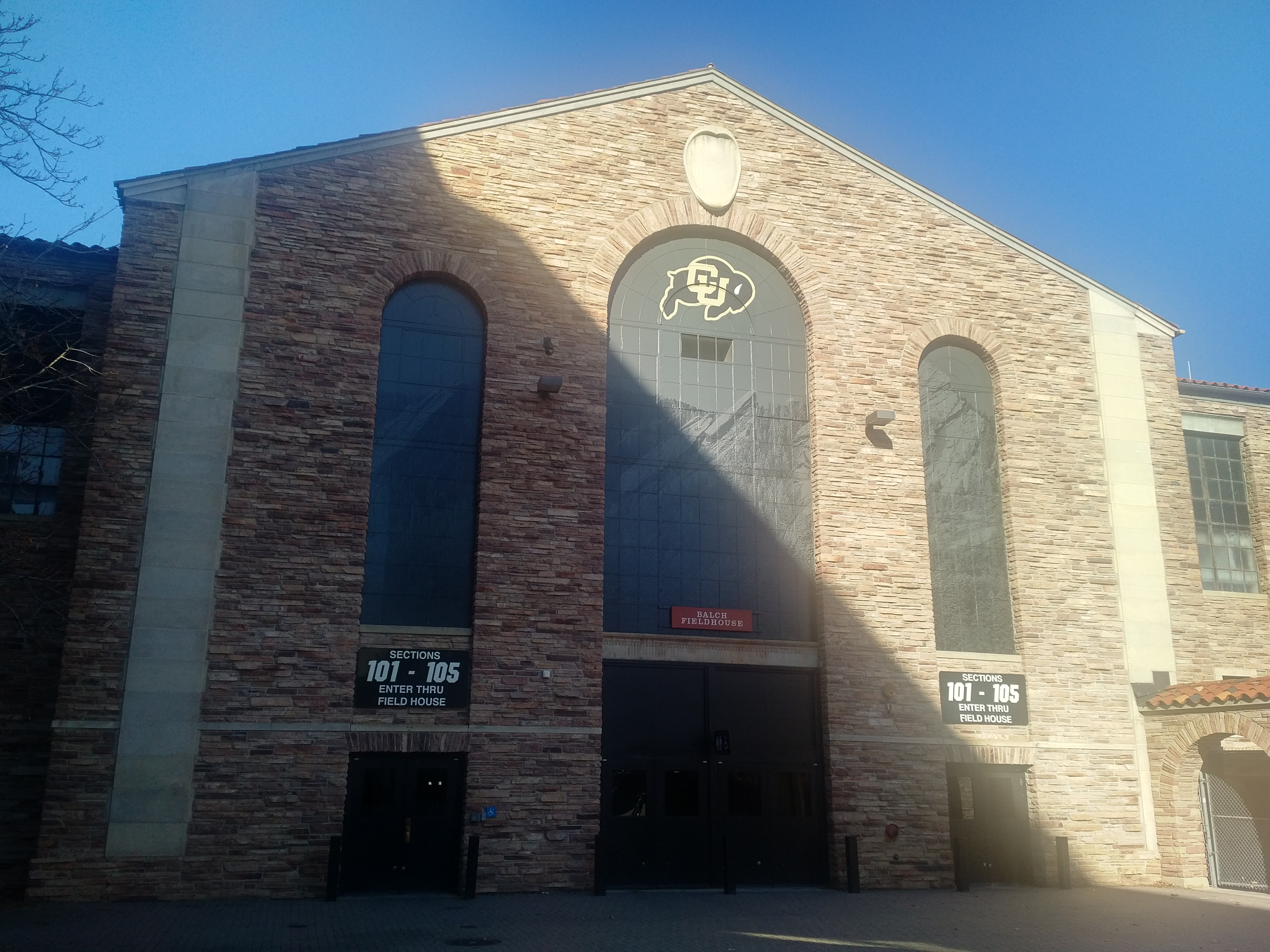
- Front entrance of Balch Fieldhouse
- Interactive map of Balch Fieldhouse
- Location: Boulder, Colorado, U.S.
- Coordinates: 40.009435°N 105.267928°W
- Owner: University of Colorado Boulder
- Capacity: 4,000 (formerly 7,000)

Construction
- Opened: 1937

Tenants
- Colorado Buffaloes men's and women's basketball (1937–1979); CU Track & Field and Cross Country

Balch Fieldhouse is a 4,000-seat multi-purpose arena in Boulder, Colorado. At one point the seating capacity was 7,000. The arena opened in 1937. It was home to the University of Colorado Buffaloes basketball teams until the CU Events Center opened in 1979.

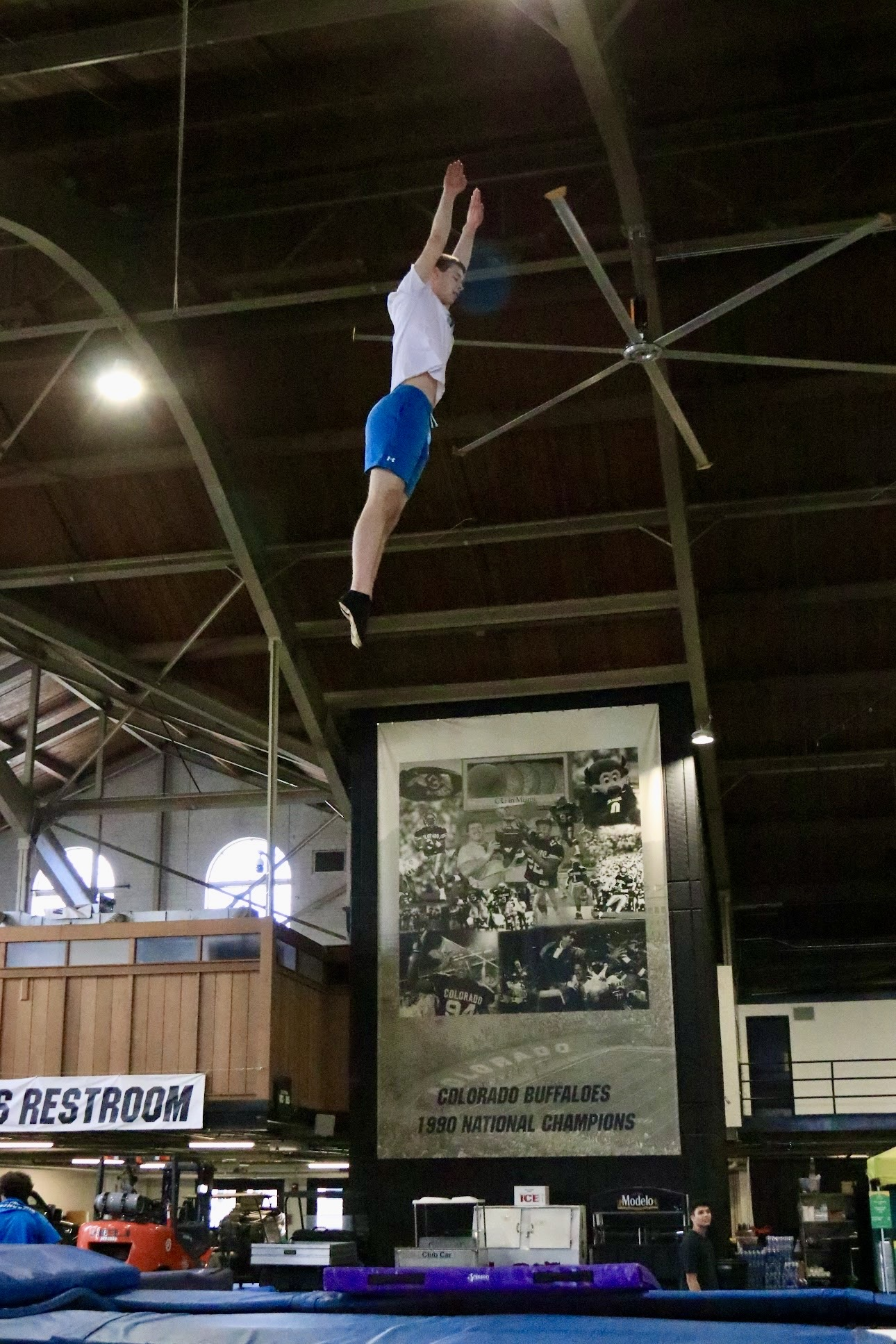
Trampoline gymnast, Emerson Scott, training with the University of Colorado Trampoline Club

The Fieldhouse includes an annex that is home to the University of Colorado's Track and Field and Cross Country and Sports Information Offices. The fieldhouse is where the track and cross country teams meet for practice during the winter. Track meets are also regularly held by Colorado during the indoor track season. USATF also holds meets on the weekends for athletes participating in club track and field.

The past three years in November it has hosted the Boulder Qualifier for the FIRST Lego League Challenge, where about 40 teams compete for a chance to advance to the state tournament.
