= 1963–64 NCAA University Division men's basketball season =

Men's collegiate basketball season

- Preseason AP No. 1: Loyola Ramblers
- NCAA Tournament: 1964
- Tournament dates: March 9 – 21, 1964
- National Championship: Municipal Auditorium; Kansas City, Missouri
- NCAA Champions: UCLA Bruins
- Helms National Champions: UCLA Bruins
- Other champions: Bradley Braves (NIT)
- Player of the Year (Helms): Walt Hazzard, UCLA Bruins

The 1963–64 NCAA University Division men's basketball season began in December 1963, progressed through the regular season and conference tournaments, and concluded with the 1964 NCAA University Division basketball tournament championship game on March 21, 1964, at Municipal Auditorium in Kansas City, Missouri. The UCLA Bruins won their first NCAA national championship with a 98–83 victory over the Duke Blue Devils.

== Season headlines ==
- The Big Sky Conference began play, with six members.

== Season outlook ==
=== Pre-season polls ===
The Top 10 from the AP Poll and the Top 20 from the UPI Coaches Poll during the pre-season.

Associated Press
Ranking	Team
1	Loyola-Chicago
2	NYU
3	Cincinnati
4	Duke
5	Wichita
6	Arizona State
7	Ohio State
8	Michigan
9	Kentucky
10	Oregon State

UPI Coaches
Ranking	Team
1	Loyola-Chicago
2	Cincinnati
3 (tie)	Duke
3 (tie)	NYU
5	Wichita
6	Arizona State
7	Ohio State
8	Michigan
9	Oregon State
10	Texas
11	Kentucky
12	Providence
13 (tie)	San Francisco
13 (tie)	UCLA
15	Villanova
16 (tie)	Kansas State
16 (tie)	Stanford
18	Minnesota
19	Oklahoma State
20	Bradley

== Conference membership changes ==
School	Former conference	New conference
Austin Peay Governors	non-NCAA University Division	Ohio Valley Conference
Fordham Rams	Metropolitan New York Conference	NCAA University Division independent
Gonzaga Bulldogs	NCAA University Division independent	Big Sky Conference
Idaho Vandals	NCAA University Division independent	Big Sky Conference
Idaho State Bengals	NCAA University Division independent	Big Sky Conference
Manhattan Jaspers	Metropolitan New York Conference	NCAA University Division independent
Montana Grizzlies	NCAA University Division independent	Big Sky Conference
Montana State Bobcats	NCAA University Division independent	Big Sky Conference
Muhlenberg Mules	Middle Atlantic Conference	non-NCAA University Division
NYU Violets	Metropolitan New York Conference	NCAA University Division independent
St. Francis Terriers	Metropolitan New York Conference	NCAA University Division independent
St. John's Redmen	Metropolitan New York Conference	NCAA University Division independent
UC-Santa Barbara Gauchos	non-NCAA University Division	West Coast Athletic Conference
Washington State Cougars	NCAA University Division independent	Athletic Association of Western Universities
Weber State Wildcats	non-NCAA University Division	Big Sky Conference

== Regular season ==
=== Conferences ===
==== Conference winners and tournaments ====
Conference	Regular season winner	Conference player of the year	Conference tournament	Tournament venue (City)	Tournament winner
Athletic Association of Western Universities	UCLA	None selected	No Tournament		
Atlantic Coast Conference	Duke	Jeff Mullins, Duke	1964 ACC men's basketball tournament	Reynolds Coliseum (Raleigh, North Carolina)	Duke
Big Eight Conference	Kansas State	None selected	No Tournament		
Big Sky Conference	Montana State	None selected	No Tournament		
Big Ten Conference	Michigan & Ohio State	None selected	No Tournament		
Ivy League	Princeton	None selected	No Tournament		
Mid-American Conference	Ohio	None selected	No Tournament		
Middle Atlantic Conference	Temple		No Tournament		
Missouri Valley Conference	Drake & Wichita	None selected	No Tournament		
Ohio Valley Conference	Murray State	Jim Jennings, Murray State	1964 Ohio Valley Conference men's basketball tournament	Jefferson County Armory (Louisville, Kentucky)	Murray State
Southeastern Conference	Kentucky	None selected	No Tournament		
Southern Conference	Davidson	Fred Hetzel, Davidson	1964 Southern Conference men's basketball tournament	Charlotte Coliseum (Charlotte, North Carolina)	VMI
Southwest Conference	Texas A&M	Bennie Lenox, Texas A&M	No Tournament		
West Coast Athletic Conference	San Francisco	Ollie Johnson, San Francisco	No Tournament		
Western Athletic Conference	Arizona State & New Mexico	None selected	No Tournament		
Yankee Conference	Connecticut & Rhode Island	None selected	No Tournament		

==== Conference standings ====
1963–64 AAWU Conference men's basketball standings
	Conf.				Overall
Team	W		L	PCT	W		L	PCT
No. 1 UCLA	15	–	0	1.000	30	–	0	1.000
Stanford	9	–	6	.600	15	–	10	.600
California	8	–	7	.533	13	–	14	.481
USC	6	–	9	.400	10	–	16	.385
Washington	5	–	10	.333	9	–	17	.346
Washington State	2	–	13	.133	5	–	21	.192
Rankings from AP Poll

1963–64 ACC men's basketball standings
	Conf.				Overall
Team	W		L	PCT	W		L	PCT
No. 3 Duke †	13	–	1	.929	26	–	5	.839
Wake Forest	9	–	5	.643	16	–	11	.593
Clemson	8	–	6	.571	13	–	12	.520
South Carolina	7	–	7	.500	10	–	14	.417
North Carolina	6	–	8	.429	12	–	12	.500
Maryland	5	–	9	.357	9	–	17	.346
Virginia	4	–	10	.286	8	–	16	.333
NC State	4	–	10	.286	8	–	11	.421
† 1964 ACC tournament winner Rankings from AP Poll

1963–64 Big Eight Conference men's basketball standings
	Conf.				Overall
Team	W		L	PCT	W		L	PCT
Kansas State	12	–	2	.857	22	–	7	.759
Colorado	9	–	5	.643	15	–	10	.600
Kansas	8	–	6	.571	13	–	12	.520
Oklahoma State	7	–	7	.500	15	–	10	.600
Missouri	7	–	7	.500	13	–	11	.542
Iowa State	5	–	9	.357	9	–	16	.360
Nebraska	5	–	9	.357	7	–	18	.280
Oklahoma	3	–	11	.214	7	–	18	.280
Rankings from AP Poll

1963–64 Big Sky men's basketball standings
	Conf.				Overall
Team	W		L	PCT	W		L	PCT
Montana State	8	–	2	.800	16	–	9	.640
Weber State	7	–	3	.700	17	–	8	.680
Idaho State	5	–	5	.500	10	–	15	.400
Gonzaga	5	–	5	.500	11	–	13	.458
Idaho	4	–	6	.400	7	–	19	.269
Montana	1	–	9	.100	6	–	17	.261

1963–64 Big Ten Conference men's basketball standings
	Conf.				Overall
Team	W		L	PCT	W		L	PCT
No. 2 Michigan	11	–	3	.786	23	–	5	.821
Ohio State	11	–	3	.786	16	–	8	.667
Minnesota	10	–	4	.714	17	–	7	.708
Michigan State	8	–	6	.571	14	–	10	.583
Purdue	8	–	6	.571	12	–	12	.500
Illinois	6	–	8	.429	13	–	11	.542
Northwestern	6	–	8	.429	8	–	13	.381
Indiana	5	–	9	.357	9	–	15	.375
Iowa	3	–	11	.214	8	–	15	.348
Wisconsin	2	–	12	.143	8	–	16	.333
Rankings from AP Poll

1963–64 Ivy League men's basketball standings
	Conf.				Overall
Team	W		L	PCT	W		L	PCT
Princeton	12	–	2	.857	20	–	9	.690
Yale	11	–	3	.786	16	–	8	.667
Pennsylvania	10	–	4	.714	14	–	10	.583
Cornell	9	–	5	.643	15	–	10	.600
Harvard	6	–	8	.429	12	–	10	.545
Columbia	6	–	8	.429	11	–	12	.478
Brown	2	–	12	.143	6	–	19	.240
Dartmouth	0	–	14	.000	2	–	23	.080
Rankings from AP Poll

1963–64 Mid-American Conference men's basketball standings
	Conf.				Overall
Team	W		L	PCT	W		L	PCT
Ohio	10	–	2	.833	21	–	6	.778
Miami (Ohio)	9	–	3	.750	17	–	7	.708
Bowling Green State	7	–	5	.583	14	–	9	.609
Western Michigan	6	–	6	.500	10	–	14	.417
Kent State	5	–	7	.417	11	–	13	.458
Toledo	4	–	8	.333	13	–	11	.542
Marshall	1	–	11	.083	6	–	17	.261
Rankings from AP Poll

1963–64 MAC men's basketball standings
	Conf.				Overall
Team	W		L	PCT	W		L	PCT
Temple	6	–	1	.857	17	–	8	.680
Saint Joseph's	5	–	1	.833	18	–	10	.643
La Salle	5	–	1	.833	16	–	9	.640
Delaware	4	–	3	.571	13	–	10	.565
Lafayette	4	–	4	.500	15	–	8	.652
Gettysburg	4	–	5	.444	15	–	9	.625
Bucknell	3	–	7	.300	8	–	13	.381
Lehigh	1	–	10	.091	5	–	17	.227
Rankings from AP Poll

1963–64 Missouri Valley Conference men's basketball standings
	Conf.				Overall
Team	W		L	PCT	W		L	PCT
No. 5 Wichita Municipal	10	–	2	.833	23	–	6	.793
Drake	10	–	2	.833	21	–	7	.750
Bradley	7	–	5	.583	23	–	6	.793
Cincinnati	6	–	6	.500	17	–	9	.654
Saint Louis	6	–	6	.500	13	–	12	.520
Tulsa	2	–	10	.167	10	–	15	.400
North Texas State	1	–	11	.083	7	–	17	.292
Rankings from AP Poll

1963–64 Ohio Valley Conference men's basketball standings
	Conf.				Overall
Team	W		L	PCT	W		L	PCT
Murray State	11	–	3	.786	16	–	9	.640
Eastern Kentucky State	9	–	5	.643	15	–	9	.625
East Tennessee State	8	–	6	.571	12	–	10	.545
Austin Peay State	7	–	7	.500	14	–	9	.609
Tennessee Tech	7	–	7	.500	11	–	11	.500
Morehead State	6	–	8	.429	10	–	11	.476
Middle Tennessee	5	–	9	.357	11	–	10	.524
Western Kentucky State	3	–	11	.214	5	–	16	.238
Rankings from AP Poll

1963–64 Southeastern Conference men's basketball standings
	Conf.				Overall
Team	W		L	PCT	W		L	PCT
No. 4 Kentucky	11	–	3	.786	21	–	6	.778
Tennessee	9	–	5	.643	16	–	8	.667
Georgia Tech	9	–	5	.643	17	–	9	.654
Vanderbilt	8	–	6	.571	19	–	6	.760
LSU	8	–	6	.571	12	–	13	.480
Georgia	8	–	6	.571	12	–	14	.462
Alabama	7	–	7	.500	14	–	12	.538
Ole Miss	7	–	7	.500	10	–	12	.455
Florida	6	–	8	.429	12	–	10	.545
Auburn	6	–	8	.429	11	–	12	.478
Mississippi State	4	–	10	.286	9	–	17	.346
Tulane	1	–	13	.071	1	–	22	.043
Rankings from AP Poll

1963–64 Southern Conference men's basketball standings
	Conf.				Overall
Team	W		L	PCT	W		L	PCT
No. 10 Davidson	9	–	2	.818	22	–	4	.846
West Virginia	11	–	3	.786	18	–	10	.643
Virginia Tech	7	–	3	.700	16	–	7	.696
VMI †	7	–	7	.500	12	–	12	.500
Furman	7	–	8	.467	11	–	15	.423
George Washington	5	–	7	.417	11	–	15	.423
William & Mary	5	–	9	.357	9	–	13	.409
The Citadel	4	–	8	.333	11	–	10	.524
Richmond	4	–	12	.250	6	–	16	.273
† Southern Conference Tournament winner Rankings from AP Poll

1963–64 Southwest Conference men's basketball standings
	Conf.				Overall
Team	W		L	PCT	W		L	PCT
Texas A&M	13	–	1	.929	18	–	7	.720
Texas Tech	11	–	3	.786	16	–	7	.696
Rice	8	–	6	.571	15	–	9	.625
Texas	8	–	6	.571	15	–	9	.625
SMU	8	–	6	.571	12	–	12	.500
Arkansas	6	–	8	.429	9	–	14	.391
Baylor	2	–	12	.143	7	–	17	.292
TCU	0	–	14	.000	4	–	20	.167
Rankings from AP Poll

1963–64 West Coast Athletic Conference men's basketball standings
	Conf.				Overall
Team	W		L	PCT	W		L	PCT
San Francisco	12	–	0	1.000	23	–	5	.821
Pacific	7	–	5	.583	15	–	11	.577
Loyola (Calif.)	6	–	6	.500	12	–	13	.480
San Jose State		–		–	14	–	10	.583
Saint Mary's	5	–	7	.417	7	–	19	.269
Pepperdine	3	–	9	.250	6	–	19	.240
Santa Clara	3	–	9	.250	6	–	20	.231
UC Santa Barbara		–		–	18	–	11	.621
Rankings from AP Poll

1963–64 WAC men's basketball standings
	Conf.				Overall
Team	W		L	PCT	W		L	PCT
New Mexico	7	–	3	.700	23	–	6	.793
Arizona State	7	–	3	.700	16	–	11	.593
BYU	5	–	5	.500	13	–	12	.520
Utah	4	–	6	.400	19	–	9	.679
Arizona	4	–	6	.400	15	–	11	.577
Wyoming	3	–	7	.300	12	–	14	.462
Rankings from AP Poll

1963–64 Yankee Conference men's basketball standings
	Conf.				Overall
Team	W		L	PCT	W		L	PCT
Rhode Island	8	–	2	.800	19	–	8	.704
Connecticut	8	–	2	.800	16	–	11	.593
Massachusetts	5	–	5	.500	15	–	9	.625
Vermont	4	–	6	.400	11	–	10	.524
Maine	3	–	7	.300	12	–	11	.522
New Hampshire	2	–	8	.200	8	–	15	.348

=== University Division independents ===
A total of 55 college teams played as University Division independents. Among them, Texas Western (25–3) had the best winning percentage (.893), and Texas Western and Oregon State (25–4) finished with the most wins.

1963–64 NCAA University Division men's basketball independents standings
	Conf.				Overall
Team	W		L	PCT	W		L	PCT
Texas Western		–		–	25	–	3	.893
No. 6 Oregon State		–		–	25	–	4	.862
No. 7 Villanova		–		–	24	–	4	.857
No. 9 DePaul		–		–	21	–	4	.840
No. 8 Loyola Chicago		–		–	22	–	6	.786
Seattle		–		–	22	–	6	.786
Hardin–Simmons		–		–	20	–	6	.769
Providence		–		–	20	–	6	.769
Creighton		–		–	22	–	7	.759
Iona		–		–	15	–	5	.750
Miami (FL)		–		–	20	–	7	.741
Army		–		–	19	–	7	.731
Utah State		–		–	21	–	8	.724
Boston University		–		–	16	–	7	.696
Duquesne		–		–	16	–	7	.696
Penn State		–		–	16	–	7	.696
Pittsburgh		–		–	17	–	8	.680
Syracuse		–		–	17	–	8	.680
Centenary		–		–	16	–	8	.667
St. Bonaventure		–		–	16	–	8	.667
Portland		–		–	17	–	9	.654
Holy Cross		–		–	15	–	8	.652
Colorado State		–		–	16	–	9	.640
NYU		–		–	17	–	10	.630
Houston		–		–	16	–	10	.615
Xavier		–		–	16	–	10	.615
Dayton		–		–	15	–	10	.600
Georgetown		–		–	15	–	10	.600
Louisville		–		–	15	–	10	.600
West Texas State		–		–	13	–	9	.591
Oklahoma City		–		–	15	–	11	.577
Regis		–		–	12	–	9	.571
Detroit		–		–	14	–	11	.560
Memphis State		–		–	14	–	11	.560
St. John's		–		–	14	–	11	.560
Oregon		–		–	14	–	11	.560
Seton Hall		–		–	13	–	12	.520
Butler		–		–	13	–	13	.500
Loyola (LA)		–		–	12	–	12	.500
Manhattan		–		–	11	–	11	.500
Air Force		–		–	11	–	12	.478
Boston College		–		–	10	–	11	.476
Navy		–		–	10	–	12	.455
Fordham		–		–	9	–	11	.450
Florida State		–		–	11	–	14	.440
Canisius		–		–	10	–	14	.417
Notre Dame		–		–	10	–	14	.417
Saint Francis (PA)		–		–	10	–	14	.417
Niagara		–		–	8	–	12	.400
St. Francis (NY)		–		–	10	–	16	.385
New Mexico State		–		–	8	–	15	.348
Colgate		–		–	7	–	16	.304
Denver		–		–	6	–	20	.231
Rutgers		–		–	5	–	17	.227
Marquette		–		–	5	–	21	.192
Rankings from AP Poll

=== Informal championships ===
Conference	Regular season winner	Most Valuable Player
Philadelphia Big 5	La Salle	Steve Courtin, Saint Joseph's, & Wali Jones, Villanova

La Salle finished with a 3–1 record in head-to-head competition among the Philadelphia Big 5.

== Post-season tournaments ==
=== NCAA tournament ===
==== Final Four ====
National semifinals
E	Duke	91
ME	Michigan	80
MW	Kansas State	84
W	UCLA	90

National finals
E	Duke	83
W	UCLA	98
Third place
ME	Michigan	100
MW	Kansas State	90

=== National Invitation tournament ===
==== Semifinals & finals ====
Semifinals
Bradley	67
Army	52
New Mexico	72
NYU	65

Finals
Bradley	86
New Mexico	54
Third place
Army	60
NYU	59

== Awards ==
=== Consensus All-American teams ===
Consensus First Team
Player	Position	Class	Team
Gary Bradds	F	Senior	Ohio State
Bill Bradley	F	Junior	Princeton
Walt Hazzard	G	Senior	UCLA
Cotton Nash	F	Senior	Kentucky
Dave Stallworth	F	Junior	Wichita

Consensus Second Team
Player	Position	Class	Team
Ron Bonham	F	Senior	Cincinnati
Mel Counts	C	Senior	Oregon State
Fred Hetzel	F	Junior	Davidson
Jeff Mullins	G	Senior	Duke
Cazzie Russell	F	Sophomore	Michigan

=== Major player of the year awards ===
- Helms Player of the Year: Walt Hazzard, UCLA
- Associated Press Player of the Year: Gary Bradds, Ohio State
- UPI Player of the Year: Gary Bradds, Ohio State
- Oscar Robertson Trophy (USBWA): Walt Hazzard, UCLA
- Sporting News Player of the Year: Bill Bradley, Princeton

=== Major coach of the year awards ===
- Henry Iba Award: John Wooden, UCLA
- NABC Coach of the Year: John Wooden, UCLA
- UPI Coach of the Year: John Wooden, UCLA
- Sporting News Coach of the Year: John Wooden, UCLA

=== Other major awards ===
- Robert V. Geasey Trophy (Top player in Philadelphia Big 5): Steve Courtin, Saint Joseph's, & Wali Jones, Villanova
- NIT/Haggerty Award (Top player in New York City metro area): Nick Werkman, Seton Hall

== Coaching changes ==
A number of teams changed coaches during the season and after it ended.

Team	Former Coach	Interim Coach	New Coach	Reason
Bucknell	Gene Evans		Don Smith	
Colgate	Bob Dewey		Bob Duffy	
Dayton	Tom Blackburn		Don Donoher	
Iowa	Sharm Scheuerman		Ralph Miller	
Kansas	Dick Harp		Ted Owens	
Marquette	Eddie Hickey		Al McGuire	
NC State	Everett Case		Press Maravich	
Notre Dame	John Jordan		John Dee	
Oregon State	Slats Gill		Paul Valenti	
South Carolina	Chuck Noe	Dwane Morrison	Frank McGuire	
Tennessee Tech	John Oldham		Ken Sidwell	Oldham left to coach Western Kentucky State.
Tulane	Ted Lenhardt		Ralph Pedersen	
Virginia Tech	William Matthews		Howie Shannon	
VMI	Weenie Miller		Gary McPherson	
Western Kentucky State	Edgar Diddle		John Oldham	
Wichita Municipal	Ralph Miller		Gary Thompson	
