= 1963–64 Georgetown Hoyas men's basketball team =

American college basketball season

1963–64 Georgetown Hoyas men's basketball
- Conference: Independent
- Record: 15–10
- Head coach: Tommy O'Keefe (4th season)
- Assistant coach: Tom Coleman (3rd season)
- Captain: Jim Christy
- Home arena: McDonough Gymnasium

1963–64 NCAA University Division men's basketball independents standings
	Conf.				Overall
Team	W		L	PCT	W		L	PCT
Texas Western		–		–	25	–	3	.893
No. 6 Oregon State		–		–	25	–	4	.862
No. 7 Villanova		–		–	24	–	4	.857
No. 9 DePaul		–		–	21	–	4	.840
No. 8 Loyola Chicago		–		–	22	–	6	.786
Seattle		–		–	22	–	6	.786
Hardin–Simmons		–		–	20	–	6	.769
Providence		–		–	20	–	6	.769
Creighton		–		–	22	–	7	.759
Iona		–		–	15	–	5	.750
Miami (FL)		–		–	20	–	7	.741
Army		–		–	19	–	7	.731
Utah State		–		–	21	–	8	.724
Boston University		–		–	16	–	7	.696
Duquesne		–		–	16	–	7	.696
Penn State		–		–	16	–	7	.696
Pittsburgh		–		–	17	–	8	.680
Syracuse		–		–	17	–	8	.680
Centenary		–		–	16	–	8	.667
St. Bonaventure		–		–	16	–	8	.667
Portland		–		–	17	–	9	.654
Holy Cross		–		–	15	–	8	.652
Colorado State		–		–	16	–	9	.640
NYU		–		–	17	–	10	.630
Houston		–		–	16	–	10	.615
Xavier		–		–	16	–	10	.615
Dayton		–		–	15	–	10	.600
Georgetown		–		–	15	–	10	.600
Louisville		–		–	15	–	10	.600
West Texas State		–		–	13	–	9	.591
Oklahoma City		–		–	15	–	11	.577
Regis		–		–	12	–	9	.571
Detroit		–		–	14	–	11	.560
Memphis State		–		–	14	–	11	.560
St. John's		–		–	14	–	11	.560
Oregon		–		–	14	–	11	.560
Seton Hall		–		–	13	–	12	.520
Butler		–		–	13	–	13	.500
Loyola (LA)		–		–	12	–	12	.500
Manhattan		–		–	11	–	11	.500
Air Force		–		–	11	–	12	.478
Boston College		–		–	10	–	11	.476
Navy		–		–	10	–	12	.455
Fordham		–		–	9	–	11	.450
Florida State		–		–	11	–	14	.440
Canisius		–		–	10	–	14	.417
Notre Dame		–		–	10	–	14	.417
Saint Francis (PA)		–		–	10	–	14	.417
Niagara		–		–	8	–	12	.400
St. Francis (NY)		–		–	10	–	16	.385
New Mexico State		–		–	8	–	15	.348
Colgate		–		–	7	–	16	.304
Denver		–		–	6	–	20	.231
Rutgers		–		–	5	–	17	.227
Marquette		–		–	5	–	21	.192
Rankings from AP Poll

The 1963–64 Georgetown Hoyas men's basketball team represented Georgetown University during the 1963–64 NCAA University Division college basketball season. Tommy O'Keefe coached them in his fourth season as head coach, but Georgetown's head coaching position paid so little that he could only coach part-time and held a full-time job outside of coaching in order to meet his financial obligations, impairing his ability to recruit players. The team was an independent and played its home games at McDonough Gymnasium on the Georgetown campus in Washington, D.C. The team finished the season with a record of 15–10 and had no postseason play.

== Season recap ==
Georgetown looked forward to having senior guard Jim Christy, the team's point guard and team captain, and junior forward Jim Barry – perhaps the best player of Georgetown men's basketball's "Classic Era" (1943–1972) – together again after their high-scoring performances the previous season, raising hopes that they could lead the team to a postseason tournament berth. Barry, however, was forced to miss the 1963–64 season while recovering from knee surgery.

Sophomore guard Jim Brown joined the varsity team this year after emerging as a top scorer on the freshman team the previous year. He started the season opener, in which his fast-break style of offense helped the Hoyas to beat Maryland by 21 points. Another newcomer to the team, sophomore forward Owen Gillen, scored 14 points and had 10 rebounds in the game.

Fifteen days later, Georgetown began play in the Quaker City Classic at the Palestra in Philadelphia, Pennsylvania. Its first opponent was No.1 Loyola of Chicago. Led by John Egan, Loyola was the defending champion from the 1963 NCAA Tournament, entered the game with a 22-game winning streak, and was a 28-point favorite. Jim Brown's defense kept Egan in check, Jim Christy scored 30 points, and the Hoyas led by 12 points at the half and won the game 69–58. It was Georgetown's first-ever victory over a No. 1-ranked opponent.

Jim Brown had a season-high 14 points against Navy. He went on to finish the season averaging 12.5 points per game and with a school-record 148 assists; he would break that record himself two seasons later.

In the Hoyas' next game, eleven days later against La Salle, Jim Christy scored on eight consecutive field goals. Two weeks after that, Christy scored his 1,000th point in a game against New York University and scored on a late-game layup that helped Georgetown to come from behind to beat NYU, pushing the Hoyas' record to 12–8 and renewing hopes that they could secure an invitation to the 1964 National Invitation Tournament. Sophomore forward John "Jake" Gibbons, meanwhile, scored 26 points in a game against George Washington. Owen Gillen had a season-high 23 points against Canisius and also had strong performances against Fordham, Boston College, Holy Cross, and Rutgers, finishing the season as the team's leading rebounder.

During a 107–92 Georgetown loss to Boston College at the Roberts Center in Chestnut Hill, Massachusetts, on February 21, 1964, Boston College guard John Austin—a Washington, D.C., native and DeMatha Catholic High School graduate who was the first African American basketball player in Boston College history—scored 49 points, setting a single-game school scoring record for the Eagles as well as the record for points scored against Georgetown by an opponent in a single game. Both records still stood as of 2018.

Four days later, Jim Christy had an historic game at Maryland on February 25, 1964. He scored 11 of the game's first 16 points and finished with a school-record 44 points, shooting 14-for-19 (73%) from the field and 16-of-18 (89%) from the free-throw line as the Hoyas upset the Terrapins. The win gave Georgetown the so-called "Big Three" title for the year among the Washington, D.C., area's three major college men's basketball teams (Georgetown, George Washington, and Maryland). As impressive as a 44-point game was, Christy's record would stand for only a year and two days until Jim Barry scored 46 points in a game in late February 1965.

The team played inconsistently most of the season and finished with a record of 15–10 and no postseason play. The 15 wins were the most by a Georgetown team since the 1951–52 team won 15, leaving observers to contemplate whether the 1963–64 team might have made the postseason if forward Jim Barry had been available to play.

The team was not ranked in the Top 20 in the Associated Press Poll or Coaches' Poll at any time.

== Roster ==
From the 1958–59 season through the 1967–68 season, Georgetown players wore even-numbered jerseys for home games and odd-numbered ones for away games; for example, a player would wear No. 10 at home and No. 11 on the road. Players are listed below by the even numbers they wore at home.

#	Name	Height	Weight (lbs.)	Position	Class	Hometown	Previous team(s)
10	Jim Christy	6'1"	185	G	Sr.	Brooklyn, New York	Saint Pascal HS
12	Joe Franz	6'5"	N/A	F	Jr.	Baltimore, Maryland	Loyola HS
14	John Prendergast	N/A	N/A	G	Jr.	Utica, New York	Notre Dame Junior Senior HS
20	Joe Mazelin	6'2"	N/A	G	Sr.	Indianapolis, Indiana	Sacred Heart HS
22	Jim Brown	5'10"	170	G	So.	Ridgewood, New Jersey	Don Bosco Preparatory HS
24	Charles "Buddy" O'Donnell	6'3"	N/A	F	Sr.	Upper Darby Township, Pennsylvania	Monsignor Bonner HS
30	James L. "Jim" Jones	6'4"	N/A	F	So.	Groveton, Virginia	Groveton HS
32	Chuck Devlin	6'5"	N/A	F	Sr.	Philadelphia, Pennsylvania	Germantown Academy
34	Ed Solano	6'3"	N/A	F	So.	Bellerose, New York	St. Mary's HS
40	Dave Philbin	6'4"	N/A	F	So.	Clinton, Massachusetts	Portsmouth Priory School
42	John "Jake" Gibbons	6'5"	200	F/C	So.	Cambria Heights, Queens, New York	Saint Francis HS
44	Owen Gillen	6'5"	210	F/C	So.	Totowa, New Jersey	Passaic Valley Regional HS
52	Tom Carroll	6'3"	N/A	F	So.	New York, New York	St. Nicholas of Tolentine HS
54	Tom Hamm	6'4"	N/A	C	So.	St. Cloud, Minnesota	Cathedral HS

== 1963–64 schedule and results ==
Date time, TV	Rank^{#}	Opponent^{#}	Result	Record	Site city, state
Regular season
Wed., Dec. 4, 1963 no, no		Maryland	W 83–72	1-0	McDonough Gymnasium; Washington, D.C.
Sat., Dec. 7, 1963 no, no		Fairleigh Dickinson	W 81–67	2-0	McDonough Gymnasium; Washington, D.C.
Tue., Dec. 10, 1963 no, no		American	W 109–79	3-0	McDonough Gymnasium; Washington, D.C.
Thu., Dec. 12, 1963 no, no		at Manhattan	W 98–87	4-0	Madison Square Garden; New York, New York
Mon., Dec. 16, 1963 no, no		at Delaware	W 93–65	5-0	Delaware Field House; Newark, Delaware
Thu., Dec. 19, 1963 no, no		at Loyola New Orleans	L 78–92	5-1	Loyola Field House; New Orleans, Louisiana
Sat., Dec. 21, 1963 no, no		at Georgia Tech	L 71–96	5-2	Alexander Memorial Coliseum; Atlanta, Georgia
Fri., Dec. 27, 1963 no, no		vs. No. 1 Loyola Chicago; Quaker City Tournament	W 69–58	6-2	Palestra; Philadelphia, Pennsylvania
Sat., Dec. 28, 1963 no, no		vs. La Salle; Quaker City Tournament	L 69–80	6-3	Palestra; Philadelphia, Pennsylvania
Sun., Dec. 29, 1963 no, no		vs. Drake; Quaker City Tournament	L 61–89	6-4	Palestra; Philadelphia, Pennsylvania
Sat., Jan. 4, 1964 no, no		at George Washington	L 69–77	6-5	Fort Myer Gymnasium; Fort Myer, Virginia
Tue., Jan. 7, 1964 no, no		Canisius	W 87–78	7-5	McDonough Gymnasium; Washington, D.C.
Sat., Jan. 11, 1964 no, no		at Fordham	W 76–70	8-5	Rose Hill Gymnasium; Bronx, New York
Tue., Jan. 14, 1964 no, no		Navy	L 64–67	8-6	McDonough Gymnasium; Washington, D.C.
Sat., Jan. 25, 1964 no, no		La Salle	W 85–81	9-6	McDonough Gymnasium; Washington, D.C.
Sat., Feb. 1, 1964 no, no		at Seton Hall	L 90–94	9-7	Walsh Gymnasium; South Orange, New Jersey
Wed., Feb. 5, 1964 no, no		at St. Joseph's	L 70–79	9-8	Palestra; Philadelphia, Pennsylvania
Sun., Feb. 9, 1964 no, no		Saint Peter's	W 120–73	10-8	McDonough Gymnasium; Washington, D.C.
Wed., Feb. 12, 1964 no, no		George Washington	W 83–81	11-8	McDonough Gymnasium; Washington, D.C.
Sat., Feb. 15, 1964 no, no		New York University	W 79–72	12-8	McDonough Gymnasium; Washington, D.C.
Mon., Feb. 17, 1964 no, no		Fairfield	W 79–73	13-8	McDonough Gymnasium; Washington, D.C.
Fri., Feb. 21, 1964 no, no		at Boston College	L 92–107	13-9	Roberts Center; Chestnut Hill, Massachusetts
Sat., Feb. 22, 1964 no, no		at Holy Cross	L 77–95	13-10	Worcester Memorial Auditorium; Worcester, Massachusetts
Tue., Feb. 25, 1964 no, no		at Maryland	W 81–78	14-10	Cole Field House; College Park, Maryland
Sat., Feb. 29, 1964 no, no		Rutgers	W 79–67	15-10	McDonough Gymnasium; Washington, D.C.
*Non-conference game. ^{#}Rankings from AP Poll. (#) Tournament seedings in parentheses.
