= 1963–64 St. John's Redmen basketball team =

Defunct New York basketball team

1963–64 St. John's Redmen men's basketball
- Conference: Independent
- Record: 14–11
- Head coach: Joseph Lapchick
- Assistant coach: Lou Carnesecca
- Captain: Dan Waddleton
- Home arena: Alumni Hall; Madison Square Garden

1963–64 NCAA University Division men's basketball independents standings
	Conf.				Overall
Team	W		L	PCT	W		L	PCT
Texas Western		–		–	25	–	3	.893
No. 6 Oregon State		–		–	25	–	4	.862
No. 7 Villanova		–		–	24	–	4	.857
No. 9 DePaul		–		–	21	–	4	.840
No. 8 Loyola Chicago		–		–	22	–	6	.786
Seattle		–		–	22	–	6	.786
Hardin–Simmons		–		–	20	–	6	.769
Providence		–		–	20	–	6	.769
Creighton		–		–	22	–	7	.759
Iona		–		–	15	–	5	.750
Miami (FL)		–		–	20	–	7	.741
Army		–		–	19	–	7	.731
Utah State		–		–	21	–	8	.724
Boston University		–		–	16	–	7	.696
Duquesne		–		–	16	–	7	.696
Penn State		–		–	16	–	7	.696
Pittsburgh		–		–	17	–	8	.680
Syracuse		–		–	17	–	8	.680
Centenary		–		–	16	–	8	.667
St. Bonaventure		–		–	16	–	8	.667
Portland		–		–	17	–	9	.654
Holy Cross		–		–	15	–	8	.652
Colorado State		–		–	16	–	9	.640
NYU		–		–	17	–	10	.630
Houston		–		–	16	–	10	.615
Xavier		–		–	16	–	10	.615
Dayton		–		–	15	–	10	.600
Georgetown		–		–	15	–	10	.600
Louisville		–		–	15	–	10	.600
West Texas State		–		–	13	–	9	.591
Oklahoma City		–		–	15	–	11	.577
Regis		–		–	12	–	9	.571
Detroit		–		–	14	–	11	.560
Memphis State		–		–	14	–	11	.560
St. John's		–		–	14	–	11	.560
Oregon		–		–	14	–	11	.560
Seton Hall		–		–	13	–	12	.520
Butler		–		–	13	–	13	.500
Loyola (LA)		–		–	12	–	12	.500
Manhattan		–		–	11	–	11	.500
Air Force		–		–	11	–	12	.478
Boston College		–		–	10	–	11	.476
Navy		–		–	10	–	12	.455
Fordham		–		–	9	–	11	.450
Florida State		–		–	11	–	14	.440
Canisius		–		–	10	–	14	.417
Notre Dame		–		–	10	–	14	.417
Saint Francis (PA)		–		–	10	–	14	.417
Niagara		–		–	8	–	12	.400
St. Francis (NY)		–		–	10	–	16	.385
New Mexico State		–		–	8	–	15	.348
Colgate		–		–	7	–	16	.304
Denver		–		–	6	–	20	.231
Rutgers		–		–	5	–	17	.227
Marquette		–		–	5	–	21	.192
Rankings from AP Poll

The 1963–64 St. John's Redmen basketball team represented St. John's University during the 1963–64 NCAA Division I college basketball season. The team was coached by Joe Lapchick in his nineteenth year at the school. St. John's was an independent and played their home games at Alumni Hall in Queens, NY and Madison Square Garden in Manhattan. They finished with a 14–11 and no postseason play.

The highlight of the season included an upset victory of defending national champions and nationally ranked #9 Loyola of Chicago.

== Roster ==
#	Name	Height	Position	Class	Hometown	Previous Team(s)
5	Jerry Houston	6"1"	G	Jr.	Bronx, NY, U.S.	La Salle Academy
20	Dan Waddleton	5'11"	G	Sr.	Jersey City, NJ, U.S.	St. Michael's HS
21	Bob Duerr	6'2"	G/F	So.	Canton, OH, U.S.	N/A
22	Ken McIntyre	6'1"	G	Jr.	Queens, NY, U.S.	Bayside HS
25	Dan Mascia	6'4"	F	So.	Brooklyn, NY, U.S.	Thomas Jefferson HS
35	Hank Cluess	6'6"	F	So.	Queens, NY, U.S.	Archbishop Molloy HS
44	Bob McIntyre	6'6"	F	So.	Queens, NY, U.S.	Holy Cross HS
	Ken Wirell	6'5"	F	Jr.	Queens, NY, U.S.	Bryant HS
	Bill Lawrence	6'1"	G	Jr.	Queens, NY, U.S.	Archbishop Molloy HS/North Carolina
	Alex Menar	6'5"	F	So.	Staten Island, NY, U.S.	La Salle Academy
	Pete Smith	6'5"	F	Jr.	N/A	N/A

== Schedule and results ==
Date time, TV	Rank^{#}	Opponent^{#}	Result	Record	Site city, state
Regular Season
Dec. 3, 1963*		George Washington	W 82–64	1–0	Alumni Hall; Queens, NY
Dec. 6, 1963*		at West Virginia; Mountaineer Classic	L 72–79	1–1	Stansbury Hall; Morgantown, WV
Dec. 7, 1963*		vs. No. 7 Ohio State; Mountaineer Classic	L 64–66	1–2	Stansbury Hall; Morgantown, WV
Dec. 14, 1963*		Seton Hall	W 69–65	2–2	Alumni Hall; Queens, NY
Dec. 17, 1963*		Ohio	L 54–58	2–3	Alumni Hall; Queens, NY
Dec. 19, 1963*		at Rhode Island	L 65–74	2–4	Keaney Gymnasium; Kingston, RI
Dec. 26, 1963*		vs. Utah; ECAC Holiday Festival	L 66–73	2–5	Madison Square Garden; New York, NY
Dec. 27, 1963*		vs. Dayton; ECAC Holiday Festival	W 88–76	3–5	Madison Square Garden; New York, NY
Dec. 30, 1963*		vs. Providence; ECAC Holiday Festival	L 67–72	3–6	Madison Square Garden; New York, NY
Jan. 4, 1964*		Syracuse	W 84–71	4–6	Alumni Hall; Queens, NY
Jan. 8, 1964*		at Temple	L 57–72	4–7	The Palestra; Philadelphia, PA
Jan. 11, 1964*		No. 9 Villanova	L 44–55	4–8	Alumni Hall (5,625); Queens, NY
Jan. 18, 1964*		St. Francis (NY)	W 62–49	5–8	Alumni Hall; Queens, NY
Jan. 25, 1964*		Saint Joseph's	L 60–72	5–9	Alumni Hall; Queens, NY
Jan. 29, 1964*		Creighton	W 64–60	6–9	Alumni Hall; Queens, NY
Feb. 1, 1964*		at Niagara	W 83–67	7–9	NU Student Center; Lewiston, NY
Feb. 8, 1964*		No. 9 Loyola (IL)	W 71–69	8–9	Alumni Hall (2,832); Queens, NY
Feb. 12, 1964*		Canisius	W 73–70	9–9	Alumni Hall; Queens, NY
Feb. 15, 1964*		at Army	L 64–67	9–10	USMA Fieldhouse; West Point, NY
Feb. 17, 1964*		at Notre Dame	L 83–89	9–11	Notre Dame Fieldhouse; South Bend, IN
Feb. 22, 1964*		Fordham	W 59–46	10–11	Alumni Hall; Queens, NY
Feb. 25, 1964*		at Massachusetts	W 81–67	11–11	Curry Hicks Cage; Amherst, MA
Feb. 29, 1964*		Marquette	W 68–60	12–11	Alumni Hall; Queens, NY
Mar. 4, 1964*		Holy Cross	W 83–78	13–11	Alumni Hall; Queens, NY
Mar. 7, 1964*		NYU	W 71–51	14–11	Alumni Hall; Queens, NY
*Non-conference game. ^{#}Rankings from AP Poll. (#) Tournament seedings in parentheses.
