= 1963–64 St. Francis Terriers men's basketball team =

American college basketball season

1963–64 St. Francis Terriers men's basketball
- Conference: Independent
- Record: 9–12
- Head coach: Daniel Lynch (16th season)
- Home arena: 69th Regiment Armory

1963–64 NCAA University Division men's basketball independents standings
	Conf.				Overall
Team	W		L	PCT	W		L	PCT
Texas Western		–		–	25	–	3	.893
No. 6 Oregon State		–		–	25	–	4	.862
No. 7 Villanova		–		–	24	–	4	.857
No. 9 DePaul		–		–	21	–	4	.840
No. 8 Loyola Chicago		–		–	22	–	6	.786
Seattle		–		–	22	–	6	.786
Hardin–Simmons		–		–	20	–	6	.769
Providence		–		–	20	–	6	.769
Creighton		–		–	22	–	7	.759
Iona		–		–	15	–	5	.750
Miami (FL)		–		–	20	–	7	.741
Army		–		–	19	–	7	.731
Utah State		–		–	21	–	8	.724
Boston University		–		–	16	–	7	.696
Duquesne		–		–	16	–	7	.696
Penn State		–		–	16	–	7	.696
Pittsburgh		–		–	17	–	8	.680
Syracuse		–		–	17	–	8	.680
Centenary		–		–	16	–	8	.667
St. Bonaventure		–		–	16	–	8	.667
Portland		–		–	17	–	9	.654
Holy Cross		–		–	15	–	8	.652
Colorado State		–		–	16	–	9	.640
NYU		–		–	17	–	10	.630
Houston		–		–	16	–	10	.615
Xavier		–		–	16	–	10	.615
Dayton		–		–	15	–	10	.600
Georgetown		–		–	15	–	10	.600
Louisville		–		–	15	–	10	.600
West Texas State		–		–	13	–	9	.591
Oklahoma City		–		–	15	–	11	.577
Regis		–		–	12	–	9	.571
Detroit		–		–	14	–	11	.560
Memphis State		–		–	14	–	11	.560
St. John's		–		–	14	–	11	.560
Oregon		–		–	14	–	11	.560
Seton Hall		–		–	13	–	12	.520
Butler		–		–	13	–	13	.500
Loyola (LA)		–		–	12	–	12	.500
Manhattan		–		–	11	–	11	.500
Air Force		–		–	11	–	12	.478
Boston College		–		–	10	–	11	.476
Navy		–		–	10	–	12	.455
Fordham		–		–	9	–	11	.450
Florida State		–		–	11	–	14	.440
Canisius		–		–	10	–	14	.417
Notre Dame		–		–	10	–	14	.417
Saint Francis (PA)		–		–	10	–	14	.417
Niagara		–		–	8	–	12	.400
St. Francis (NY)		–		–	10	–	16	.385
New Mexico State		–		–	8	–	15	.348
Colgate		–		–	7	–	16	.304
Denver		–		–	6	–	20	.231
Rutgers		–		–	5	–	17	.227
Marquette		–		–	5	–	21	.192
Rankings from AP Poll

The 1963–64 St. Francis Terriers men's basketball team represented St. Francis College during the 1963–64 NCAA men's basketball season. The team was coached by Daniel Lynch, who was in his sixteenth year at the helm of the St. Francis Terriers. The team played as an independent and was not affiliated with a conference. The Terriers played their home games at the 69th Regiment Armory in Manhattan.

The Terriers finished the season at 9–12.

== Roster ==
1963–64 St. Francis Brooklyn Terriers men's basketball team
Players
Coaches

Pos.	#	Name	Height	Weight	Year	Previous school	Hometown
F	45	Tom Kurowski	6 ft 1 in (1.85 m)	—	Sr
C	41	Ted Kotch	6 ft 8 in (2.03 m)	—	So
G	31	Richie Alexander	5 ft 11 in (1.8 m)	—	Sr
	43	John O'Boyle	5 ft 9 in (1.75 m)	—	Sr
G	25	Jim Rishe	5 ft 10 in (1.78 m)	—	Sr
F	11	Richard Marquardt	6 ft 7 in (2.01 m)	—
F	23	Ed Lein	6 ft 5 in (1.96 m)	—
F	35	George Steinman	6 ft 4 in (1.93 m)	—
G	21	Jack Crispi	—	—	So
	53	Paul De Loca	—	—
	33	John Riddell	6 ft 3 in (1.91 m)	—
F	55	Mark Turenshine	6 ft 5 in (1.96 m)	—	So	Sheepshead Bay High School
		Anthony Alvarez	6 ft 3 in (1.91 m)	—

Head coach

- Daniel Lynch (St. Francis '38)

Assistant coach(es)

Legend

- (C) Team captain
- (S) Suspended
- (I) Ineligible
- (W) Walk-on
- Injured
- Current redshirt

== Schedule and results ==
Date time, TV	Opponent	Result	Record	Site city, state
Regular Season
November 30, 1963*	at Hunter	W 71–30	1–0	New York, NY
December 4, 1963*; 8:00 pm	Pace	W 86–44	2–0	69th Regiment Armory (800); New York, NY
December 7, 1963*	at Providence	L 56–67	2–1	Alumni Hall; Providence, RI
December 10, 1963*	at Bridgeport	W 69–64	3–1	Bridgeport, CT
December 13, 1963*	at Queens	W 57–55	4–1	Fitzgerald Gymnasium (700); Flushing, NY
December 17, 1963*	at Loyola (MD)	L 71–73	4–2	(1,500); Baltimore, MD
January 2, 1964*	at Brooklyn	W 57–55	5–2	Roosevelt Gymnasium (800); Brooklyn, NY
January 4, 1964*	Siena	W 54–52	6–2	69th Regiment Armory (500); New York, NY
January 7, 1964*	at No. 9 Villanova	L 48–84	6–3	Villanova Field House; Villanova, PA
January 11, 1964*	Le Moyne	L 54–58	6–4	69th Regiment Armory; New York, NY
January 18, 1964*	at St. John's	L 49–62	6–5	Alumni Gymnasium (3,200); Jamaica, NY
January 27, 1964*	Niagara	W 59–38	7–5	69th Regiment Armory (700); New York, NY
February 1, 1964*	at King's (PA)	W 58–57	8–5	Wilkes-Barre, PA
February 5, 1964*	Adelphi	L 62–63	8–6	69th Regiment Armory; New York, NY
February 8, 1964*	Iona	L 57–68	8–7	69th Regiment Armory; New York, NY
February 15, 1964*	Saint Peter's	L 64–74	8–8	69th Regiment Armory (500); New York, NY
February 19, 1964*	C.C.N.Y.	W 61–54	9–8	69th Regiment Armory (700); New York, NY
February 20, 1964*; 7:00 pm	vs. Manhattan	L 60–88	9–9	Madison Square Garden (7,122); New York, NY
February 22, 1964*	at NYU	L 54–70	9–10	Alumni Gymnasium; Bronx, NY
February 26, 1964*	at Seton Hall	L 70–88	9–11	Walsh Gymnasium (2,733); South Orange, NJ
February 29, 1964*	at Siena	L 51–60	9–12	Albany, NY
*Non-conference game. ^{#}Rankings from AP Poll. (#) Tournament seedings in parentheses. All times are in Eastern Time.
