= 1963–64 NCAA University Division men's basketball rankings =

- Season: 1963–64
- NCAA Tournament: 1964
- Preseason No. 1: Loyola-Chicago
- NCAA Tournament Champions: UCLA
NCAA University Division men's basketball rankings


The 1963–64 NCAA men's basketball rankings was made up of two human polls, the AP Poll and the Coaches Poll.

== Legend ==
	Increase in ranking
	Decrease in ranking
	New to rankings from previous week
Italics	Number of first place votes
(#–#)	Win–loss record
т	Tied with team above or below also with this symbol

== AP Poll ==
All AP polls for this season included only ten ranked teams.

	Preseason	Week 2 Dec. 10	Week 3 Dec. 17	Week 4 Dec. 24	Week 5 Dec. 31	Week 6 Jan. 7	Week 7 Jan. 14	Week 8 Jan. 21	Week 9 Jan. 28	Week 10 Feb. 4	Week 11 Feb. 11	Week 12 Feb. 18	Week 13 Feb. 25	Week 14 Mar. 3	Final Mar. 10	
1.	Loyola-Chicago	Loyola-Chicago (2–0)	Loyola-Chicago (4–0)	Loyola-Chicago (6–0)	Kentucky (8–0)	UCLA (11–0) (31)	UCLA (13–0)	UCLA (15–0)	UCLA (15–0)	UCLA (17–0)	UCLA (19–0)	UCLA (21–0)	UCLA (23–0)	UCLA (25–0)	UCLA (26–0)	1.
2.	NYU	NYU (2–0)	Kentucky (5–0)	Kentucky (7–0)	UCLA (9–0)	Kentucky (10–2) (2)	Loyola-Chicago (11–1)	Michigan (12–1)	Michigan (14–1)	Michigan (15–1)	Michigan (16–2)	Michigan (17–2)	Kentucky (20–3)	Michigan (19–3)	Michigan (20–4)	2.
3.	Cincinnati	Duke (3–0)	Michigan (5–0)	Michigan (6–0)	Loyola-Chicago (8–1)	Loyola-Chicago (10–1)	Michigan (11–1)	Loyola-Chicago (11–1)	Davidson (15–0)	Kentucky (15–2)	Kentucky (17–2)	Kentucky (18–2)	Michigan (18–3)	Kentucky (21–4)	Duke (23–4)	3.
4.	Duke	Arizona State (2–0)	Cincinnati (3–1)	UCLA (6–0)	Cincinnati (7–1)	Michigan (10–1)	Kentucky (12–2)	Davidson (14–0)	Kentucky (14–2)	Wichita (16–3)	Davidson (18–1)	Duke (17–3)	Duke (20–4)	Duke (20–4)	Kentucky (21–4)	4.
5.	Wichita	Kentucky (3–0)	Duke (4–1)	Cincinnati (5–1)	Michigan (8–1)	Davidson (10–0)	Davidson (12–0)	Kentucky (13–2)	Vanderbilt (13–1)	Davidson (16–1)	Duke (15–3)	Villanova (19–2)	Wichita (19–5)	Wichita (21–5)	Wichita (22–5)	5.
6.	Arizona State	Cincinnati (2–1)	UCLA (4–0)	Vanderbilt (7–0)	Vanderbilt (9–0)	Oregon State (11–2)	Vanderbilt (12–1)	Vanderbilt (13–1)	Villanova (14–1)	Villanova (16–1)	Wichita (17–4)	Wichita (18–5)	Oregon State (23–3)	Oregon State (25–3)	Oregon State (25–3)	6.
7.	Ohio State	Michigan (3–0)	NYU (4–1)	Davidson (7–0)	Davidson (7–0)	Vanderbilt (10–1)	Oregon State (13–2)	Villanova (12–1)	Wichita (14–3)	Duke (13–3)	Vanderbilt (17–2)	Oregon State (21–3)	Davidson (21–3)	Villanova (21–3)	Villanova (22–3)	7.
8.	Michigan	Ohio State (3–1)	Vanderbilt (5–0)	Duke (6–2)	Oregon State (9–1)	Cincinnati (8–3)	Cincinnati (9–3)	Duke (10–3)	Duke (11–3)	Vanderbilt (14–2)	Villanova (17–2)	Davidson (19–3)	Villanova (19–3)	DePaul (20–2)	Loyola-Chicago (20–5)	8.
9.	Kentucky	Oregon State (4–0)	Toledo (6–0)	Oregon State (7–1)	Duke (6–2)	Villanova (9–1)	Villanova (11–1)	DePaul (12–0)	DePaul (12–0)	Loyola-Chicago (14–3)	Oregon State (20–3)	DePaul (16–2)	DePaul (18–2)	Loyola-Chicago (19–5)	DePaul (21–2)	9.
10.	Oregon State	Kansas	Davidson (6–0)	NYU (4–2)	Villanova (8–1)	Duke (8–3)	Duke (10–3)	Wichita (13–3) т Oregon State (14–3) т	Loyola-Chicago (11–3)	DePaul (12–1)	DePaul (14–2)	Drake (17–4)	Loyola-Chicago (17–5)	Davidson (22–4)	Davidson (22–4)	10.
	Preseason	Week 2 Dec. 10	Week 3 Dec. 17	Week 4 Dec. 24	Week 5 Dec. 31	Week 6 Jan. 7	Week 7 Jan. 14	Week 8 Jan. 21	Week 9 Jan. 28	Week 10 Feb. 4	Week 11 Feb. 11	Week 12 Feb. 18	Week 13 Feb. 25	Week 14 Mar. 3	Final Mar. 10	
		Dropped: Wichita (2–2)	Dropped: Arizona State (2–4); Ohio State; Oregon State (5–1); Kansas	Dropped: Toledo (6–2)	Dropped: NYU (7–2)	None	None	Dropped: Cincinnati (9–5)	Dropped: Oregon State (16–3)	None	Dropped: Loyola-Chicago (14–5)	Dropped: Vanderbilt (17–4)	Dropped: Drake (18–5)	None	None	

== UPI Poll ==
	Preseason	Week 2 Dec. 10	Week 3 Dec. 17	Week 4 Dec. 24	Week 5 Dec. 31	Week 6 Jan. 7	Week 7 Jan. 14	Week 8 Jan. 21	Week 9 Jan. 28	Week 10 Feb. 4	Week 11 Feb. 11	Week 12 Feb. 18	Week 13 Feb. 25	Week 14 Mar. 3	Final Mar. 10	
1.	Loyola-Chicago	Loyola-Chicago (2–0)	Loyola-Chicago (4–0)	Loyola-Chicago (6–0)	Kentucky (8–0)	UCLA (11–0)	UCLA (13–0)	UCLA (15–0)	UCLA (15–0)	UCLA (17–0)	UCLA (19–0)	UCLA (21–0)	UCLA (23–0)	UCLA (25–0)	UCLA (26–0)	1.
2.	Cincinnati	Duke (3–0)	Michigan (5–0)	Michigan (6–0)	UCLA (9–0)	Kentucky (10–2)	Loyola-Chicago (11–1)	Loyola-Chicago (11–1)	Michigan (14–1)	Michigan (15–1)	Kentucky (17–2)	Michigan (17–2)	Kentucky (20–3)	Kentucky (21–4)	Michigan (20–4)	2.
3.	NYU т	NYU (2–0)	Kentucky (5–0)	Kentucky (7–0)	Loyola-Chicago (8–1)	Loyola-Chicago (10–1)	Michigan (11–1)	Michigan (12–1)	Kentucky (14–2)	Kentucky (15–2)	Michigan (16–2)	Kentucky (18–2)	Michigan (18–3)	Michigan (19–3)	Kentucky (21–4)	3.
4.	Duke т	Arizona State (2–0)	Duke (4–1)	Cincinnati (5–1)	Michigan (8–1)	Michigan (10–1)	Kentucky (12–2)	Kentucky (13–2)	Davidson (15–0)	Wichita (16–3)	Davidson (18–1)	Duke (17–3)	Duke (20–4)	Duke (20–4)	Duke (23–4)	4.
5.	Wichita	Michigan (3–0)	Cincinnati (3–1)	UCLA (6–0)	Cincinnati (7–1)	Davidson (10–0)	Davidson (12–0)	Davidson (14–0)	Vanderbilt (13–1)	Davidson (16–1)	Duke (15–3)	Villanova (19–2)	Oregon State (23–3)	Oregon State (25–3)	Oregon State (25–3)	5.
6.	Arizona State	Cincinnati (2–1)	UCLA (4–0)	Vanderbilt (7–0)	Vanderbilt (9–0)	Oregon State (11–2)	Vanderbilt (12–1)	Vanderbilt (13–1)	Wichita (14–3)	Villanova (16–1)	Wichita (17–4)	Oregon State (21–3)	Wichita (19–5)	Wichita (21–5)	Wichita (22–5)	6.
7.	Ohio State	Kentucky (3–0) т	NYU (4–1)	Oregon State (7–1)	Davidson (7–0)	Vanderbilt (10–1)	Oregon State (13–2)	Villanova (12–1)	Villanova (14–1)	Duke (13–3)	Vanderbilt (17–2)	Wichita (18–5)	Villanova (19–3)	Villanova (21–3)	Villanova (22–3)	7.
8.	Michigan	Oregon State (4–0) т	Texas (5–0)	Davidson (7–0)	Oregon State (9–1)	Cincinnati (8–3)	Cincinnati (9–3)	Wichita (13–3)	Duke (11–3)	Vanderbilt (14–2)	Oregon State (20–3)	Davidson (19–3)	Davidson (21–3)	Loyola-Chicago (19–5)	Loyola-Chicago (20–5)	8.
9.	Oregon State	Texas (3–0)	Vanderbilt (5–0)	Duke (6–2)	Duke (6–2)	Duke (8–3)	Duke (10–3)	Duke (10–3)	Loyola-Chicago (11–3)	Loyola-Chicago (14–3)	Villanova (17–2)	Vanderbilt (17–4)	Loyola-Chicago (17–5)	Davidson (22–4)	Texas Western (23–2)	9.
10.	Texas	Ohio State (3–1)	Toledo (6–0) т	NYU (4–2)	Villanova (8–1)	Villanova (9–1)	Villanova (11–1)	Oregon State (14–3)	Oregon State (16–3)	Oregon State (18–3)	Texas Western (18–2)	Loyola-Chicago (15–5)	Texas Western (22–2)	Texas Western (23–2)	Davidson (22–4)	10.
11.	Kentucky	Kansas (2–0)	Davidson (6–0) т	Villanova (6–1)	Wichita (9–3)	Wichita (10–3)	Texas Western (15–1)	Texas Western (15–1)	Texas Western (16–1)	Texas Western (17–2)	Loyola-Chicago (14–5)	Texas Western (19–2)	DePaul (18–2) т	Drake (20–5)	DePaul (21–2)	11.
12.	Providence	Wichita (2–2)	Oregon State (5–1) т	Creighton (9–1) т	Stanford (6–0)	Utah (11–1)	Wichita (11–3)	DePaul (12–0)	DePaul (12–0)	Oklahoma State (12–4)	Oklahoma State (13–5)	Drake (17–4)	Ohio State (14–7) т	DePaul (20–2)	Kansas State (19–5)	12.
13.	San Francisco т	San Francisco (3–0)	Minnesota (4–0)	Toledo (6–2) т	Minnesota (7–3)	Texas Western (13–1)	DePaul (10–0) т	Oklahoma State (11–3)	Illinois (9–3)	DePaul (12–1)	Utah (18–3)	DePaul (16–2)	Drake (18–5) т	Ohio State (15–7)	Drake (20–6) т	13.
14.	UCLA т	UCLA (2–0)	Wichita (4–2)	Texas Western (10–1)	Kansas State (7–3)	Kansas State (8–3)	Utah (13–2) т	Cincinnati (9–5)	Utah State (12–2)	Illinois (10–3)	DePaul (14–2)	Ohio State (12–7)	Vanderbilt (18–5) т	Vanderbilt (19–6)	San Francisco (22–4) т	14.
15.	Villanova	Villanova (2–0)	Arizona State (2–4)	Minnesota (5–2)	Texas Western (12–1)	Saint Louis (11–3)	Illinois (8–3)	Utah (14–3)	Cincinnati (9–6)	Utah (17–3)	Drake (14–4) т	San Francisco (15–4) т	San Francisco (17–4)	Arizona State (15–10) т	Utah State (20–6)	15.
16.	Kansas State т	Vanderbilt (3–0)	Oklahoma City (5–1)	Bradley (5–2)	St. Bonaventure (8–1)	St. Bonaventure (10–1) т	Stanford (9–2)	Bradley (10–4)	Creighton (15–2)	New Mexico (16–2)	Ohio State (11–7) т	Utah (18–5) т	Utah State (18–4)	Kansas State (17–5) т	New Mexico (22–5)	16.
17.	Stanford т	Minnesota (3–0)	Kansas State (4–2)	Kansas State (5–2)	NYU (7–2) т	Stanford (7–2) т	Utah State (9–2)	Utah State (10–2)	New Mexico (14–2) т	Drake (13–3) т	Illinois (10–6)	Tennessee (15–5) т	Kansas State (16–5)	New Mexico (20–5)	Ohio State (17–7)	17.
18.	Minnesota	Stanford (2–0)	Creighton (6–0)	St. Bonaventure (6–0)	Utah (9–1) т	Bradley (8–3)	Creighton (12–2) т	Illinois (8–3)	Utah (15–3) т	Ohio (13–3) т	New Mexico (16–3)	Texas A&M (12–6) т	New Mexico (18–5) т	Providence (18–5) т	Texas A&M (18–6)	18.
19.	Oklahoma State	Kansas State (2–1)	Bradley (5–1)	Stanford (4–0)	North Carolina (5–2) т	Illinois (7–3)	New Mexico (11–2) т	New Mexico (14–2)	Oklahoma State (11–3)	Tennessee (11–5) т	Bradley (13–5) т	New Mexico (18–3)	Providence (17–4) т	San Francisco (19–4) т	Arizona State (16–10) т	19.
20.	Bradley	Oklahoma State (2–0)	Georgia Tech (2–0); Villanova (4–1)	Arizona State (4–4)	Oklahoma State (8–3) т	La Salle (8–2) т Minnesota (8–3) т	St. Bonaventure (10–1) т	Stanford (9–4)	Tennessee (10–4)	Utah State (13–3) т	Texas A&M (11–6) т Utah State (16–3) т	Utah State (17–3)	Seattle (17–4) т St. Bonaventure (15–5); Texas A&M (14–6)	Texas A&M (16–6) т Utah State (20–5) т	Providence (20–5) т	20.
	Preseason	Week 2 Dec. 10	Week 3 Dec. 17	Week 4 Dec. 24	Week 5 Dec. 31	Week 6 Jan. 7	Week 7 Jan. 14	Week 8 Jan. 21	Week 9 Jan. 28	Week 10 Feb. 4	Week 11 Feb. 11	Week 12 Feb. 18	Week 13 Feb. 25	Week 14 Mar. 3	Final Mar. 10	
		Dropped: Providence; Bradley	Dropped: Ohio State; Kansas; San Francisco; Stanford; Oklahoma State	Dropped: Texas; Wichita; Oklahoma City; Georgia Tech	Dropped: Creighton; Toledo; Bradley; Arizona State	Dropped: NYU; North Carolina; Oklahoma State	Dropped: Kansas State; Saint Louis; Bradley; La Salle; Minnesota	Dropped: Creighton (13–2); St. Bonaventure	Dropped: Bradley; Stanford	Dropped: Cincinnati; Creighton	Dropped: Ohio; Tennessee	Dropped: Oklahoma State; Illinois; Bradley	Dropped: Utah; Tennessee	Dropped: Seattle; St. Bonaventure	Dropped: Vanderbilt	
