= 1963–64 Wichita Shockers men's basketball team =

American college basketball season

1963–64 Wichita State Shockers men's basketball

Missouri Valley Conference Champions

NCAA tournament, Elite Eight
- Conference: Missouri Valley Conference

Ranking
- Coaches: No. 6
- AP: No. 5
- Record: 23–5 (10–2 MVC)
- Head coach: Ralph Miller (13th season)
- Assistant coach: Gary Thompson
- Home arena: University of Wichita Field House (10,506)

1963–64 Missouri Valley Conference men's basketball standings
	Conf.				Overall
Team	W		L	PCT	W		L	PCT
No. 5 Wichita Municipal	10	–	2	.833	23	–	6	.793
Drake	10	–	2	.833	21	–	7	.750
Bradley	7	–	5	.583	23	–	6	.793
Cincinnati	6	–	6	.500	17	–	9	.654
Saint Louis	6	–	6	.500	13	–	12	.520
Tulsa	2	–	10	.167	10	–	15	.400
North Texas State	1	–	11	.083	7	–	17	.292
Rankings from AP Poll

The 1963–64 Wichita Shockers men's basketball team represented Wichita State University in the 1963–64 NCAA University Division men's basketball season. They played their home games at the University of Wichita Field House. They were in their 19th season as a member of the Missouri Valley Conference and 58th season overall. They were led by head coach Ralph Miller in his 13th and final season at the school. They finished the season 23–5, 10–2 in Missouri Valley play to finish in first place. They received a bid to the 1964 NCAA Tournament and advanced to the regional finals before falling to Kansas State.

== Roster ==
1963–64 Wichita State Shockers men's basketball team
Players
Coaches

Pos.	#	Name	Height	Weight	Year	Hometown
C	12	Nate Bowman	6 ft 10 in (2.08 m)	225 lb (102 kg)	Jr	Fort Worth, Texas
F	42	Dave Stallworth	6 ft 7 in (2.01 m)	—	Jr	Dallas, Texas

Head coach

- Ralph Miller (Kansas)

Assistant coach(es)

- Gary Thompson (Wichita State)

Legend

- (C) Team captain
- (S) Suspended
- (I) Ineligible
- (W) Walk-on
- Injured
- Current redshirt

== Schedule and results ==
Date time, TV	Rank^{#}	Opponent^{#}	Result	Record	Site (attendance) city, state
Regular season
Nov 30, 1963*	No. 5	Wyoming	W 82–67	1–0	University of Wichita Field House; Wichita, Kansas
Dec 2, 1963*	No. 5	Colorado	W 71–61	2–0	University of Wichita Field House; Wichita, Kansas
Dec 4, 1963*	No. 5	at UTEP	L 74–75	2–1	Memorial Gymnasium; El Paso, Texas
Dec 7, 1963*	No. 5	at No. 6 Arizona State	L 87–93	2–2	Sun Devil Gym; Tempe, Arizona
Dec 10, 1963*		Duquesne	W 91–74	3–2	University of Wichita Field House; Wichita, Kansas
Dec 14, 1963		Bradley	W 56–50	4–2 (1–0)	University of Wichita Field House; Wichita, Kansas
Dec 16, 1963*		Texas	W 76–57	5–2	University of Wichita Field House; Wichita, Kansas
Dec 19, 1963*		at Minnesota	W 71–65	6–2	Williams Arena; Minneapolis, Minnesota
Dec 21, 1963*		at Ohio State	L 60–78	6–3	St. John Arena; Columbus, Ohio
Dec 26, 1963*		vs. Montana State; All-College Tournament	W 85–69	7–3	Oklahoma City, Oklahoma
Dec 27, 1963*		vs. Texas A&M; All-College Tournament	W 70–56	8–3	Oklahoma City, Oklahoma
Dec 28, 1963*		at Oklahoma City; All-College Tournament	W 80–47	9–3	Frederickson Fieldhouse; Oklahoma City, Oklahoma
Jan 4, 1964		Drake	W 67–49	10–3 (2–0)	University of Wichita Field House; Wichita, Kansas
Jan 11, 1964		at Tulsa	W 88–66	11–3 (3–0)	Expo Square Pavilion; Tulsa, Oklahoma
Jan 13, 1964		at Saint Louis	W 69–56	12–3 (4–0)	Kiel Auditorium; St. Louis, Missouri
Jan 18, 1964		at North Texas	W 86–70	13–3 (5–0)	North Texas Men's Gym; Denton, Texas
Jan 25, 1964*	No. 10	at No. 3 Loyola-Chicago	W 80–76	14–3	Alumni Gym; Chicago, Illinois
Jan 30, 1964	No. 7	Cincinnati	W 62–59	15–3 (6–0)	University of Wichita Field House; Wichita, Kansas
Feb 1, 1964*	No. 7	Marquette	W 100–63	16–3	University of Wichita Field House; Wichita, Kansas
Feb 4, 1964*	No. 4	No. 9 Loyola-Chicago	W 65–60	17–3	University of Wichita Field House; Wichita, Kansas
Feb 8, 1964	No. 4	at Bradley	L 74–76	17–4 (6–1)	Robertson Memorial Field House; Peoria, Illinois
Feb 10, 1964	No. 6	at Drake	L 63–64	17–5 (6–2)	Veterans Memorial Auditorium; Des Moines, Iowa
Feb 15, 1964	No. 6	at Cincinnati	W 59–58	18–5 (7–2)	Armory Fieldhouse; Cincinnati, Ohio
Feb 22, 1964	No. 6	Saint Louis	W 86–71	19–5 (8–2)	University of Wichita Field House; Wichita, Kansas
Feb 29, 1964	No. 5	Tulsa	W 98–79	20–5 (9–2)	University of Wichita Field House; Wichita, Kansas
Mar 2, 1964	No. 5	North Texas	W 90–83	21–5 (10–2)	University of Wichita Field House; Wichita, Kansas
Mar 6, 1964	No. 5	vs. Drake; Conference Playoff	W 58–50	22–5	
1964 NCAA Tournament
Mar 13, 1964*	No. 5	vs. Creighton; Midwest Regional semifinal – Sweet Sixteen	W 84–68	23–5	University of Wichita Field House; Wichita, Kansas
Mar 14, 1964*	No. 5	vs. Kansas State; Midwest Regional final – Elite Eight	L 86–94	23–6	University of Wichita Field House; Wichita, Kansas
*Non-conference game. ^{#}Rankings from AP Poll. (#) Tournament seedings in parentheses. MW=Midwest. All times are in Central Time.

== Rankings ==
Ranking movements Legend: ██ Increase in ranking ██ Decrease in ranking — = Not ranked
	Week														
Poll	Pre	1	2	3	4	5	6	7	8	9	10	11	12	13	Final
AP	5	—	—	—	—	—	—	10	7	4	6	6	5	5	5
Coaches	5	12	14	—	11	11	12	10	7	4	6	6	6	6	6

== Awards and honors ==
- Dave Stallworth – Consensus First-team All-American
