= List of 1964–65 NBA season transactions =

These are the list of personnel changes in the NBA from the 1964–65 NBA season.

== Events ==
=== August 8, 1964 ===
- The Baltimore Bullets hired Buddy Jeannette as head coach.

=== August 26, 1964 ===
- The Cincinnati Royals sold Steve Courtin to the Baltimore Bullets.
- The St. Louis Hawks sold Jerry Grote to the Philadelphia 76ers.

=== September 24, 1964 ===
- The Detroit Pistons waived Jim Davis.

=== October 17, 1964 ===
- The New York Knicks sold Al Butler to the Baltimore Bullets.

=== October 18, 1964 ===
- The New York Knicks traded Bill McGill to the St. Louis Hawks for a 1965 2nd round draft pick (Hal Blevins was later selected).

=== November 2, 1964 ===
- The Boston Celtics signed Gerry Ward as a free agent.

=== November 11, 1964 ===
- The Baltimore Bullets signed Gary Hill as a free agent.

=== December 27, 1964 ===
- The St. Louis Hawks fired Harry Gallatin as head coach.
- The St. Louis Hawks appointed Richie Guerin as head coach.

=== January 3, 1965 ===
- The New York Knicks reassigned Head Coach Eddie Donovan.
- The New York Knicks hired Harry Gallatin as head coach.

=== January 15, 1965 ===
- The San Francisco Warriors traded Wilt Chamberlain to the Philadelphia 76ers for Connie Dierking, Paul Neumann, Lee Shaffer and cash.

=== January 22, 1965 ===
- The Philadelphia 76ers signed Steve Courtin as a free agent.

=== January 28, 1965 ===
- The Los Angeles Lakers signed Bill McGill as a free agent.

=== February 2, 1965 ===
- The San Francisco Warriors signed John Rudometkin as a free agent.

=== February 3, 1965 ===
- The San Francisco Warriors signed John Rudometkin as a free agent.

=== February 8, 1965 ===
- The San Francisco Warriors signed Cotton Nash as a free agent.

=== February 14, 1965 ===
- The New York Knicks signed Barry Kramer as a free agent.

=== May 13, 1965 ===
- The Baltimore Bullets reassigned Head Coach Buddy Jeannette.
- The Baltimore Bullets appointed Buddy Jeannette as general manager.
- The Baltimore Bullets hired Paul Seymour as head coach.
