= 1963–64 Creighton Bluejays men's basketball team =

American college basketball season

1963–64 Creighton Bluejays men's basketball
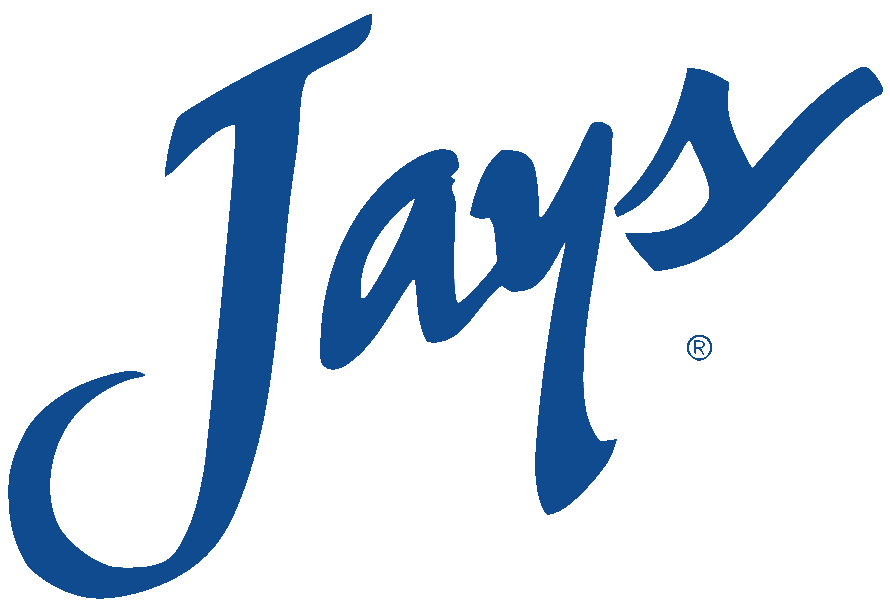

1964 NCAA Tournament, Sweet Sixteen
- Conference: Independent
- Record: 22–7
- Head coach: Red McManus
- Assistant coach: Herb Millard
- Home arena: Omaha Civic Auditorium

1963–64 NCAA University Division men's basketball independents standings
	Conf.				Overall
Team	W		L	PCT	W		L	PCT
Texas Western		–		–	25	–	3	.893
No. 6 Oregon State		–		–	25	–	4	.862
No. 7 Villanova		–		–	24	–	4	.857
No. 9 DePaul		–		–	21	–	4	.840
No. 8 Loyola Chicago		–		–	22	–	6	.786
Seattle		–		–	22	–	6	.786
Hardin–Simmons		–		–	20	–	6	.769
Providence		–		–	20	–	6	.769
Creighton		–		–	22	–	7	.759
Iona		–		–	15	–	5	.750
Miami (FL)		–		–	20	–	7	.741
Army		–		–	19	–	7	.731
Utah State		–		–	21	–	8	.724
Boston University		–		–	16	–	7	.696
Duquesne		–		–	16	–	7	.696
Penn State		–		–	16	–	7	.696
Pittsburgh		–		–	17	–	8	.680
Syracuse		–		–	17	–	8	.680
Centenary		–		–	16	–	8	.667
St. Bonaventure		–		–	16	–	8	.667
Portland		–		–	17	–	9	.654
Holy Cross		–		–	15	–	8	.652
Colorado State		–		–	16	–	9	.640
NYU		–		–	17	–	10	.630
Houston		–		–	16	–	10	.615
Xavier		–		–	16	–	10	.615
Dayton		–		–	15	–	10	.600
Georgetown		–		–	15	–	10	.600
Louisville		–		–	15	–	10	.600
West Texas State		–		–	13	–	9	.591
Oklahoma City		–		–	15	–	11	.577
Regis		–		–	12	–	9	.571
Detroit		–		–	14	–	11	.560
Memphis State		–		–	14	–	11	.560
St. John's		–		–	14	–	11	.560
Oregon		–		–	14	–	11	.560
Seton Hall		–		–	13	–	12	.520
Butler		–		–	13	–	13	.500
Loyola (LA)		–		–	12	–	12	.500
Manhattan		–		–	11	–	11	.500
Air Force		–		–	11	–	12	.478
Boston College		–		–	10	–	11	.476
Navy		–		–	10	–	12	.455
Fordham		–		–	9	–	11	.450
Florida State		–		–	11	–	14	.440
Canisius		–		–	10	–	14	.417
Notre Dame		–		–	10	–	14	.417
Saint Francis (PA)		–		–	10	–	14	.417
Niagara		–		–	8	–	12	.400
St. Francis (NY)		–		–	10	–	16	.385
New Mexico State		–		–	8	–	15	.348
Colgate		–		–	7	–	16	.304
Denver		–		–	6	–	20	.231
Rutgers		–		–	5	–	17	.227
Marquette		–		–	5	–	21	.192
Rankings from AP Poll

The 1963–64 Creighton Bluejays men's basketball team represented Creighton University during the 1963–64 NCAA University Division men's basketball season. The Bluejays, led by fifth year head coach John J. 'Red' McManus and All-American Paul Silas, played their home games at the Omaha Civic Auditorium. The Bluejays set six new team records, plus home attendance marks. The Jays played before 86,856 fans in 13 home games at Omaha's Civic Auditorium including a standing room only crowd of 10,556 for the Oklahoma City game. They finished the season 22–7. The 22 wins were the most ever for a Creighton team, as were the 2,441 points and 84.2 scoring average with 1,024 field goals. Single game marks for most points and field goals were established in the Bluejay's 124–94 win over Miami University of Florida when Creighton tallied a record 54 field goals. The Jays worst loss came at the hands of the Oklahoma City Chiefs in their first meeting 85–101.

The Creighton Bluejays earned a bid into the 1964 NCAA Tournament where they defeated Oklahoma City University in the Midwest Region Quarterfinals round before falling in the Midwest Region Semifinals to Wichita University. They fell to Texas Western in the Midwest Region Third Place game.

== Season summary ==
The Bluejays started the season off by winning nine games in a row before running into the NCAA champion UCLA Bruins on the West Coast. The Jays opened the season by pounding Colorado 85–72 with the help of a zone defense that stifled the Buffs. With Paul Silas playing very little because of a knee injury, Hardin–Simmons was downed 72–58. Charlie Brown hit 8 field goals to lead the Bluejays to a 77–62 Homecoming victory over LaSalle and Harry Forehand hit six points in the last minute of play to pull the Jays from a 57–61 deficit to a 63–61 victory over Idaho State to make it four wins in a row for Creighton.

The Jays took a last second victory from #4 ranked Arizona State 84–83. The game was highlighted by Chuck Officer's game-tying shot while in a prone position on the court and Bobby Miles free throw shooting in the two overtime periods. Creighton made it six in a row by beating Utah State 96–91. The Bluejays then defeated Iowa 77–72 in one overtime and beat Gonzaga 89–79 before heading for the West Coast. Creighton toppled Long Beach State 99–93 before running into the Bruin buzz-saw and losing 79–95. The Jays rebounded against Nevada 92-63 and South Dakota 75-54 before being routed by Oklahoma City 85–101. The Bluejays then beat Notre Dame 95–81 before a capacity crowd with Silas hitting a season high 37 points.

New Mexico State and Marquette fell to the Bluejays 99–73 and 84–57 before they headed for their ill-fated East Coast trip. Losing two out of three games doomed the Jay's chances for any national ranking as the fell to Providence 77–80 and St John's 60–64 after toppling Canisius 74–72. Creighton returned home to defeat Aquinas 106–60. The Bluejays then lost their only home game in a heartbreaking last-second defeat by the Memphis State Tigers 86–87. Miami was then shot down 124–94 under the warm Florida sun and Western Michigan was beaten 88–72 in a Chicago snow storm.

Creighton got revenge for an earlier defeat by trouncing Oklahoma City 94–77 before the largest crowd ever to witness a Bluejay game in the Civic Auditorium. The Jays then traveled to New York City where Chuck Officer made a last-second shot to dump NYU 88–86 in Madison Square Garden and make up for some prestige lost in the earlier eastern trip. Notre Dame again felt the sting of Creighton's hot shooting hand as the Irish went down 84–71 at South Bend, Indiana. In the play-off for an NCAA Midwest Regional Tournament spot, the Jays downed Oklahoma City for the second time 89–78 in Dallas, Texas.

Invited to the NCAA post-season playoffs for the second time in three years, the Bluejays took it on the chin twice to place fourth in the Midwest Regional tourney at Wichita, Kansas. In the opening round the Wichita University Shockers, complete with a near 10,000 home fan cheering section, bounced the Jays 68–83. An excessive amount of fouls plus some cold shooting doomed the Bluejays from the start. Creighton's Paul Silas held highly touted Shocker Dave Stallworth to one field goal and two free throws in the first half. Texas Western knocked off the Jays in the consolation game the following night 52-63. Poor foul shooting again plagued Creighton as they hit only 50 percent from the line. The Bluejays out-shot the Miners from the field 22–21.

All-American Paul Silas rounded his collegiate basketball career by competing for a berth on the United States Olympic Basketball Team. The 6'7" senior led the 1963–64 Jays to their best record (22–7) as captain and set six new individual player records to add to two written in 1961–62. Silas, who guided the Bluejays to two NCAA tournament berths in his three-year career, led the nation in rebounding his sophomore and junior years. He was named to many all-opponent and All-American teams.

== Roster ==
Number	Name	Position	Height	Weight	Year	Hometown
23	Bill Pfalmer				Junior	
41	Merrill Smet				Sophomore	
44	Loren James				Senior	
35	Paul Silas	Center	6–7	220	Senior	Oakland, California
43	Elton McGriff	Forward	6-9	225	Junior	Corsicana, Texas
45	Jim Bakos				Senior	East Chicago, Indiana
32	Tom Apke				Junior	
21	Charlie Brown				Junior	
25	Harry Forehand				Senior	
	Tom Potter					
	Fred Losch				Junior	
33	Fritz Pointer				Sophomore	
24	Chuck Officer	Guard	6-2	175	Senior	Moline, Illinois
42	Mike Lyons				Senior	
31	Bobby Miles				Sophomore	

== Schedule ==
Date time, TV	Rank^{#}	Opponent^{#}	Result	Record	Site (attendance) city, state
Regular Season
November 30, 1963		Colorado	W 85–72	1–0	Omaha Civic Auditorium (–); Omaha, NE
December 3, 1963		Hardin–Simmons	W 72–58	2–0	Omaha Civic Auditorium (–); Omaha, NE
December 6, 1963		La Salle; Homecoming	W 77–62	3–0	Omaha Civic Auditorium (–); Omaha, NE
December 9, 1963		Idaho State	W 63–61	4–0	Omaha Civic Auditorium (–); Omaha, NE
December 13, 1963		No. 4 Arizona State	W 84–83	5–0	Omaha Civic Auditorium (–); Omaha, NE
December 14, 1963		Utah State	W 96–91 ^{2OT}	6–0	Omaha Civic Auditorium (–); Omaha, NE
December 16, 1963		at Iowa	W 77–72 ^{OT}	7–0	Iowa Field House (–); Iowa City, IA
December 18, 1963		Gonzaga	W 89–79	8–0	Omaha Civic Auditorium (–); Omaha, NE
December 20, 1963		at Long Beach State	W 99–93	9–0	(–); Long Beach, CA
December 21, 1963		at No. 6 UCLA	L 79–95	9–1	(–); Long Beach, CA
December 23, 1963		at Nevada	W 92–63	10–1	(–); Reno, NV
December 28, 1963		at South Dakota	W 75–54	11–1	(–); Vermillion, SD
January 4, 1964		at Oklahoma City	L 85–101	11–2	Frederickson Fieldhouse (–); Oklahoma City, OK
January 11, 1964		Notre Dame	W 95–81	12–2	Omaha Civic Auditorium (–); Omaha, NE
January 14, 1964		New Mexico State	W 99–73	13–2	Omaha Civic Auditorium (–); Omaha, NE
January 23, 1964		Marquette	W 84–57	14–2	Omaha Civic Auditorium (–); Omaha, NE
January 25, 1964		at Canisius	W 74–72	15–2	(–); Buffalo, NY
January 27, 1964		at Providence	L 77–80	15–3	Alumni Hall (–); Providence, RI
January 29, 1964		at St. John's	L 60–64	15–4	Alumni Hall (–); Jamaica, NY
February 1, 1964		Aquinas	W 106–60	16–4	Omaha Civic Auditorium (–); Omaha, NE
February 5, 1964		Memphis State	L 86–87	16–5	Omaha Civic Auditorium (–); Omaha, NE
February 10, 1964		at Miami (FL)	W 124–94	17–5	(–); Coral Gables, FL
February 15, 1964		vs. Western Michigan	W 88–72	18–5	(–); Chicago, IL
February 17, 1964		Oklahoma City	W 94–77	19–5	Omaha Civic Auditorium (10,556); Omaha, NE
February 26, 1964		at NYU	W 106–60	20–5	Madison Square Garden (–); New York, NY
February 29, 1964		at Notre Dame	W 84–71	21–5	Notre Dame Fieldhouse (–); South Bend, IN
NCAA Tournament
March 9, 1964		vs. Oklahoma City; Midwest Region Quarterfinals	W 89–78	22–5	Moody Coliseum (–); Dallas, TX
March 13, 1964		vs. No. 5 Wichita; Midwest Region Semifinals	L 68–84	22–6	The Roundhouse (–); Wichita, KS
March 14, 1964		vs. Texas Western; Midwest Region Third Place Game	L 52–63	22–7	The Roundhouse (–); Wichita, KS
