= 1963–64 Michigan Wolverines men's basketball team =

American college basketball season

1963–64 Michigan Wolverines men's basketball

Big Ten regular season co-champions

NCAA tournament, Final Four
- Conference: Big Ten Conference

Ranking
- Coaches: No. 2
- AP: No. 2
- Record: 23–5 (11–3 Big Ten)
- Head coach: Dave Strack
- Assistant coaches: James Skala; Tom Jorgensen (freshman coach)
- MVP: Cazzie Russell
- Captain: Bob Cantrell
- Home arena: Fielding H. Yost Field House

1963–64 Big Ten Conference men's basketball standings
| | Conf. | | | | Overall |
| Team | W | | L | PCT | W | | L | PCT |
|---|---|---|---|---|---|---|---|---|
| No. 2 Michigan | 11 | – | 3 | .786 | 23 | – | 5 | .821 |
| Ohio State | 11 | – | 3 | .786 | 16 | – | 8 | .667 |
| Minnesota | 10 | – | 4 | .714 | 17 | – | 7 | .708 |
| Michigan State | 8 | – | 6 | .571 | 14 | – | 10 | .583 |
| Purdue | 8 | – | 6 | .571 | 12 | – | 12 | .500 |
| Illinois | 6 | – | 8 | .429 | 13 | – | 11 | .542 |
| Northwestern | 6 | – | 8 | .429 | 8 | – | 13 | .381 |
| Indiana | 5 | – | 9 | .357 | 9 | – | 15 | .375 |
| Iowa | 3 | – | 11 | .214 | 8 | – | 15 | .348 |
| Wisconsin | 2 | – | 12 | .143 | 8 | – | 16 | .333 |
Rankings from AP Poll

The 1963–64 Michigan Wolverines men's basketball team represented the University of Michigan in intercollegiate college basketball during the 1963–64 season. The team played its home games at Fielding H. Yost Field House on the school's campus in Ann Arbor, Michigan. Under the direction of head coach Dave Strack, the team tied for the Big Ten Conference Championship with the Ohio State Buckeyes. This was the first of three consecutive Big Ten titles and Michigan's first visit to the NCAA Division I men's basketball tournament Final Four. According to the Michigan's Basketball media guide, during the season junior Bill Buntin led the Big Ten conference in rebounding, although the Big Ten records, which count only conference games, do not recognize this fact. The team earned the Big Ten team statistical championships for both scoring defense (75.5) and scoring margin (10.3). Sophomore Cazzie Russell led the team in scoring with 24.8, while Buntin added 23.2 points per game. The team spent the entire 15-week season ranked in the Associated Press Top Ten Poll, ending the season ranked number two after starting the season ranked number eight. The team also finished the season ranked number two in the final UPI Coaches' Poll. Bob Cantrell served as team captain, while Russell earned team MVP. Buntin earned All-American recognition. During the season, Russell established the school single-season point total record with 670. On December 11, 1963, against the Butler Bulldogs, Buntin made all eleven of his field goals which is the best 100% shooting night in Michigan history. Russell made 150 of 178 free throws to establish the school single-season free throw percentage record of 84.27, which stood for 32 years and continues to be the highest percentage by a Wolverine sophomore. Buntin made 151 free throws which was a school record that Russell eclipsed the following season.

In the 25-team 1964 NCAA Division I men's basketball tournament, Michigan had an opening round bye before defeating the Loyola Ramblers 84–80 and the Ohio Bobcats 69–57 to win the Mideast region. In the final four, the team lost to a Jeff Mullins-led Duke Blue Devils team 91–80 before defeating Kansas State 100–90 in the consolation game. In the tournament Buntin set an NCAA tournament final four single-game record by making 15 free throws on March 21 against the Wildcats. The record was broken the following season on March 20, 1965. Although the team lost in the national semi-finals, it would return its two key stars and reach the finals of the 1965 NCAA Division I men's basketball tournament the following season.

== Schedule ==
1963–64 Overall: 23–5 Big Ten: 11–3 (t-1st | Co-Champions) Postseason: NCAA (Mideast) (Final Four; Third Place) Head Coach: Dave Strack Staff: James Skala & Tom Jorgensen (Freshmen) Captain: Bob Cantrell Home Arena: Yost Field House (7,500)

Date Rank Opponent Score
11/30/1963 #8 at Ball State 90–76
12/2/1963 #8 Tulane 73–47
12/6/1963 #8 Nebraska 80–55
12/11/1963 #7 at Butler 80–70
12/14/1963 #7 Western Michigan 104–81
12/21/1963 #3 #5 Duke 83–67
12/26/1963 #3 vs. #10 NYU 83–74
12/27/1963 #3 vs. #4 UCLA 80–98
12/28/1963 #3 vs. Pittsburgh 95–80
12/31/1963 #5 Detroit 117–87
1/4/1964 #5 Northwestern 85–73
1/11/1964 #4 at Purdue 77–70
1/18/1964 #3 Ohio State 82–64
1/21/1964 #2 at Minnesota 80–66
1/25/1964 #2 at Michigan State 91–77
2/1/1964 #2 Michigan State 95–79
2/3/1964 #2 at Ohio State 85–86
2/8/1964 #2 at Illinois 93–82
2/15/1964 #2 Indiana 99–87
2/18/1964 #2 at Minnesota 75–89
2/22/1964 #2 at Wisconsin 103–59
2/29/1964 #3 Illinois 89–83
3/7/1964 #2 at Iowa 69–61
3/9/1964 #2 Purdue 79–81
3/13/1964 #2 vs. #8 Loyola-Chicago 84–80
3/14/1964 #2 vs. Ohio University 69–57
3/20/1964 #2 vs. #3 Duke 80–91
3/21/1964 #2 vs. Kansas State100–90

(1) Los Angeles Classic, Los Angeles, Calif. (L.A. Sports Arena) (2) NCAA Tournament, Minneapolis, Minn. (Williams Arena) (3) NCAA Tournament, Kansas City, Mo. (Municipal Auditorium) (4) NC Consolation game

== Rankings ==
Ranking movements Legend: ██ Increase in ranking ██ Decrease in ranking
| | Week | | | | | | | | | | | | | | |
| Poll | Pre | 1 | 2 | 3 | 4 | 5 | 6 | 7 | 8 | 9 | 10 | 11 | 12 | 13 | Final |
|---|---|---|---|---|---|---|---|---|---|---|---|---|---|---|---|
| AP Poll | 8 | 7 | 3 | 3 | 5 | 4 | 3 | 2 | 2 | 2 | 2 | 2 | 3 | 2 | 2 |

== Notes ==
- In the Los Angeles Basketball Classic, UCLA defeated then third-ranked Michigan, 98-80 in front of 14,241 in the Los Angeles Sports Arena.

== Team players drafted into the NBA ==
Four players from this team were selected in the NBA draft.

| Year | Round | Pick | Overall | Player | NBA Club |
| 1965 | 1 | Territorial | 2 | Bill Buntin | Detroit Pistons |
| 1965 | 15 | 3 | 103 | George Pomey | St. Louis Hawks |
| 1966 | 1 | 1 | 1 | Cazzie Russell | New York Knicks |
| 1966 | 3 | 2 | 22 | Oliver Darden | Detroit Pistons |

== See also ==
- List of NCAA men's Division I Final Four appearances by coach
- List of the NCAA Division I men's basketball tournament Final Four participants
- NCAA Men's Division I Final Four appearances by school
- NCAA Men's Division I Tournament bids by school
- NCAA Men's Division I Tournament bids by school and conference
- NCAA Division I men's basketball tournament all-time team records
