= 1963–64 Kansas State Wildcats men's basketball team =

American college basketball season

1963–64 Kansas State Wildcats men's basketball

Big Eight Champions

NCAA tournament, Fourth Place
- Conference: Big Eight Conference

Ranking
- Coaches: No. 12
- Record: 21–7 (12–2 Big Eight)
- Head coach: Tex Winter (11th season)
- Home arena: Ahearn Field House

1963–64 Big Eight Conference men's basketball standings
| | Conf. | | | | Overall |
| Team | W | | L | PCT | W | | L | PCT |
|---|---|---|---|---|---|---|---|---|
| Kansas State | 12 | – | 2 | .857 | 22 | – | 7 | .759 |
| Colorado | 9 | – | 5 | .643 | 15 | – | 10 | .600 |
| Kansas | 8 | – | 6 | .571 | 13 | – | 12 | .520 |
| Oklahoma State | 7 | – | 7 | .500 | 15 | – | 10 | .600 |
| Missouri | 7 | – | 7 | .500 | 13 | – | 11 | .542 |
| Iowa State | 5 | – | 9 | .357 | 9 | – | 16 | .360 |
| Nebraska | 5 | – | 9 | .357 | 7 | – | 18 | .280 |
| Oklahoma | 3 | – | 11 | .214 | 7 | – | 18 | .280 |
Rankings from AP Poll

The 1963–64 Kansas State Wildcats men's basketball team represented Kansas State University as a member of the Big 8 Conference during the 1963–64 NCAA University Division men's basketball season. The head coach was Tex Winter, innovator of the Triangle offense and future member of the Basketball Hall of Fame, who was in his 11th year at the helm. The Wildcats, powered by a 13-game winning streak, finished with a record of 22–7 (12–2 Big 8), and reached the Final Four.

The team played its home games at Ahearn Field House in Manhattan, Kansas.

== Roster ==
1963–64 Kansas State Wildcats men's basketball team
| Players | Coaches |
|---|---|
| Pos. / # / Name / Height / Weight / Year / Hometown; F / / Willie Murrell / 6 ft 6 in (1.98 m) / 220 lb (100 kg) / Sr / Taft, Oklahoma | Head coach: Tex Winter; Assistant coach(es) Legend: (C) Team captain; (S) Suspended; (I) Ineligible; (W) Walk-on; Injured; Current redshirt; Roster |

== Schedule and results ==
| Date time, TV | Rank^{#} | Opponent^{#} | Result | Record | Site city, state |
Non-conference Regular season
| Nov 30, 1963* | | Minnesota | L 66–76 | 0–1 | Ahearn Field House; Manhattan, Kansas |
| Dec 7, 1963* | | at Saint Louis | W 68–67 | 1–1 | Kiel Auditorium; St. Louis, Missouri |
| Dec 9, 1963* | | at Indiana | W 93–84 | 2–1 | New Fieldhouse; Bloomington, Indiana |
| Dec 13, 1963* | | vs. UCLA | L 75–78 | 2–2 | Allen Fieldhouse; Lawrence, Kansas |
| Dec 14, 1963* | | USC | W 82–58 | 3–2 | Ahearn Field House; Manhattan, Kansas |
| Dec 18, 1963* | | Denver | W 72–65 | 4–2 | Ahearn Field House; Manhattan, Kansas |
| Dec 23, 1963* | | at No. 5 Cincinnati | L 70–72 | 4–3 | Armory Fieldhouse; Cincinnati, Ohio |
| Dec 26, 1963* | | vs. Nebraska; Big 8 Holiday Tournament | W 100–78 | 5–3 | Municipal Auditorium; Kansas City, Missouri |
| Dec 28, 1963* | | vs. Missouri; Big 8 Holiday Tournament | W 84–67 | 6–3 | Municipal Auditorium; Kansas City, Missouri |
| Dec 30, 1963* | | vs. Oklahoma State; Big 8 Holiday Tournament | W 58–55 | 7–3 | Municipal Auditorium; Kansas City, Missouri |
Big Eight Regular season
| Jan 6, 1964 | | Colorado | L 59–60 | 7–4 (0–1) | Ahearn Field House; Manhattan, Kansas |
| Jan 11, 1964 | | Iowa State | W 73–52 | 8–4 (1–1) | Ahearn Field House; Manhattan, Kansas |
| Jan 13, 1964 | | at Oklahoma State | L 58–77 | 8–5 (1–2) | Gallagher-Iba Arena; Stillwater, Oklahoma |
| Jan 27, 1964 | | at Oklahoma | W 97–91 | 9–5 (2–2) | Field House; Norman, Oklahoma |
| Feb 1, 1964 | | Kansas; Sunflower Showdown | W 58–55 | 10–5 (3–2) | Ahearn Field House; Manhattan, KS |
| Feb 3, 1964 | | at Nebraska | W 73–66 ^{OT} | 11–5 (4–2) | Nebraska Coliseum; Lincoln, Nebraska |
| Feb 8, 1964 | | at Colorado | W 60–59 ^{OT} | 12–5 (5–2) | Balch Fieldhouse; Boulder, Colorado |
| Feb 15, 1964 | | at Missouri | W 89–79 ^{OT} | 13–5 (6–2) | Brewer Fieldhouse; Columbia, Missouri |
| Feb 17, 1964 | | Nebraska | W 50–48 | 14–5 (7–2) | Ahearn Field House |
| Feb 22, 1964 | | at Kansas; Sunflower showdown | W 70–46 | 15–5 (8–2) | Allen Fieldhouse; Lawrence, Kansas |
| Feb 29, 1964 | | Oklahoma | W 99–70 | 16–5 (9–2) | Ahearn Field House; Manhattan, Kansas |
| Mar 2, 1964 | | Oklahoma State | W 63–59 ^{OT} | 17–5 (10–2) | Ahearn Field House; Manhattan, Kansas |
| Mar 7, 1964 | | Missouri | W 88–68 | 18–5 (11–2) | Ahearn Field House; Manhattan, Kansas |
| Mar 9, 1964 | | at Iowa State | W 74–69 | 19–5 (12–2) | Iowa State Armory; Ames, IA |
NCAA Tournament
| Mar 13, 1964* | | vs. Texas-El Paso; Midwest Regional semifinal – Sweet Sixteen | W 64–60 | 20–5 | University of Wichita Field House; Wichita, KS |
| Mar 14, 1964* | | vs. No. 5 Wichita; Midwest Regional final – Elite Eight | W 94–86 | 21–5 | University of Wichita Field House; Wichita, KS |
| Mar 20, 1964* | | vs. No. 1 UCLA; National semifinal – Final Four | L 84–90 | 21–6 | Municipal Auditorium; Kansas City, MO |
| Mar 21, 1964* | | vs. No. 2 Michigan; National consolation Game – Third Place | L 90–100 | 21–7 | Municipal Auditorium; Kansas City, MO |
*Non-conference game. ^{#}Rankings from AP Poll. (#) Tournament seedings in parentheses. MW=Midwest.

== Rankings ==
Ranking movements Legend: ██ Increase in ranking ██ Decrease in ranking — = Not ranked
| | Week | | | | | | | | | | | | | | |
| Poll | Pre | 1 | 2 | 3 | 4 | 5 | 6 | 7 | 8 | 9 | 10 | 11 | 12 | 13 | Final |
|---|---|---|---|---|---|---|---|---|---|---|---|---|---|---|---|
| AP | — | — | — | — | — | — | — | — | — | — | — | — | — | — | — |
| Coaches | 16 | 19 | 17 | 17 | 14 | 14 | — | — | — | — | — | — | 17 | 15 | 12 |
