= 1964 NCAA University Division basketball tournament =

Edition of USA college basketball tournament

- Season: 1963–64
- Teams: 25
- Finals site: Municipal Auditorium, Kansas City, Missouri
- Champions: UCLA Bruins (1st title, 1st title game, 2nd Final Four)
- Runner-up: Duke Blue Devils (1st title game, 2nd Final Four)
- Semifinalists: Kansas State Wildcats (4th Final Four); Michigan Wolverines (1st Final Four)
- Winning coach: John Wooden (1st title)
- MOP: Walt Hazzard (UCLA)
- Attendance: 140,790
- Top scorer: Jeff Mullins (Duke) (116 points)

The 1964 NCAA University Division basketball tournament involved 25 schools playing in single-elimination play to determine the national champion of men's NCAA Division I college basketball in the United States. The 26th annual edition of the tournament began on March 9, 1964, and ended with the championship game on March 21, at the Municipal Auditorium in Kansas City, Missouri. A total of 29 games were played, including a third place game in each region and a national third place game.

UCLA, coached by John Wooden, won the national title with a 98–83 victory in the final game over Duke. Walt Hazzard of UCLA was named the tournament's Most Outstanding Player. The title was the first in the history of the UCLA program, and was a sign of things to come, as the Bruins would win nine more championships in the next eleven seasons.

== Locations ==
Round	Region	Site	Venue
First Round	East	Philadelphia, Pennsylvania	The Palestra
First Round	Mideast	Evanston, Illinois	McGaw Memorial Hall
First Round	Midwest	Dallas, Texas	SMU Coliseum
First Round	West	Eugene, Oregon	McArthur Court
Regionals	East	Raleigh, North Carolina	Reynolds Coliseum
Regionals	Mideast	Minneapolis, Minnesota	Williams Arena
Regionals	Midwest	Wichita, Kansas	U. of Wichita Field House
Regionals	West	Corvallis, Oregon	Oregon State Coliseum
Final Four		Kansas City, Missouri	Municipal Auditorium

== Teams ==
Region	Team	Coach	Conference	Finished	Final Opponent	Score
East
East	Connecticut	Fred Shabel	Yankee	Regional Runner-up	Duke	L 101–54
East	Duke	Vic Bubas	Atlantic Coast	Runner Up	UCLA	L 98–83
East	Princeton	Butch van Breda Kolff	Ivy League	Regional Fourth Place	Villanova	L 74–62
East	Providence	Joe Mullaney	Independent	First round	Villanova	L 77–66
East	Temple	Harry Litwack	Middle Atlantic	First round	Connecticut	L 53–48
East	Villanova	Jack Kraft	Independent	Regional third place	Princeton	W 74–62
East	VMI	Weenie Miller	Southern	First round	Princeton	L 86–60
Mideast
Mideast	Kentucky	Adolph Rupp	Southeastern	Regional Fourth Place	Loyola–Chicago	L 100–91
Mideast	Louisville	Peck Hickman	Independent	First round	Ohio	L 71–69
Mideast	Loyola–Chicago	George Ireland	Independent	Regional third place	Kentucky	W 100–91
Mideast	Michigan	Dave Strack	Big Ten	Third Place	Kansas State	W 100–90
Mideast	Murray State	Cal Luther	Ohio Valley	First round	Loyola–Chicago	L 101–91
Mideast	Ohio	James Snyder	Mid-American	Regional Runner-up	Michigan	L 69–57
Midwest
Midwest	Creighton	Red McManus	Independent	Regional Fourth Place	Texas Western	L 63–52
Midwest	Kansas State	Tex Winter	Big Eight	Fourth Place	Michigan	L 100–90
Midwest	Oklahoma City	Abe Lemons	Independent	First round	Creighton	L 89–78
Midwest	Texas A&M	Shelby Metcalf	Southwest	First round	Texas Western	L 68–62
Midwest	Texas Western	Don Haskins	Independent	Regional third place	Creighton	W 63–52
Midwest	Wichita State	Ralph Miller	Missouri Valley	Regional Runner-up	Kansas State	L 94–86
West
West	Arizona State	Ned Wulk	Western Athletic	First round	Utah State	L 92–90
West	Oregon State	Slats Gill	Independent	First round	Seattle	L 61–57
West	San Francisco	Pete Peletta	West Coast Athletic	Regional Runner-up	UCLA	L 76–72
West	Seattle	Bob Boyd	Independent	Regional third place	Utah State	W 88–78
West	UCLA	John Wooden	AAWU	Champion	Duke	W 98–83
West	Utah State	LaDell Andersen	Independent	Regional Fourth Place	Seattle	L 88–78

== Bracket ==
* – Denotes overtime period

=== East region ===
Quarterfinals
Villanova	77
Providence	66
Connecticut	53
Temple	48
Princeton	86
VMI	60

Semifinals
Duke	87
Villanova	73
Connecticut	52
Princeton	50

Finals
Duke	101
Connecticut	54
Third place
Villanova	74
Princeton	62

=== Mideast region ===
Quarterfinals
Ohio	71
Louisville	69*
Loyola–Chicago	101
Murray State	91

Semifinals
Kentucky	69
Ohio	85
Michigan	84
Loyola–Chicago	80

Finals
Ohio	57
Michigan	69
Third place
Loyola–Chicago	100
Kentucky	91

=== Midwest region ===
Quarterfinals
Creighton	89
Oklahoma City	78
Texas Western	68
Texas A&M	62

Semifinals
Wichita State	84
Creighton	68
Kansas State	64
Texas Western	60

Finals
Wichita State	86
Kansas State	94
Third place
Texas Western	63
Creighton	52

=== West region ===
Quarterfinals
Seattle	61
Oregon State	57
Utah State	92
Arizona State	90

Semifinals
UCLA	95
Seattle	90
San Francisco	64
Utah State	58

Finals
UCLA	76
San Francisco	72
Third place
Seattle	88
Utah State	78

=== Final Four ===
National Semifinals
E	Duke	91
ME	Michigan	80
MW	Kansas State	84
W	UCLA	90

National Championship Game
E	Duke	83
W	UCLA	98
National Third Place Game
ME	Michigan	100
MW	Kansas State	90

== See also ==
- 1964 NCAA College Division basketball tournament
- 1964 National Invitation Tournament
- 1964 NAIA basketball tournament
