= 1963–64 Loyola Ramblers men's basketball team =

American college basketball season

1963–64 Loyola Ramblers men's basketball
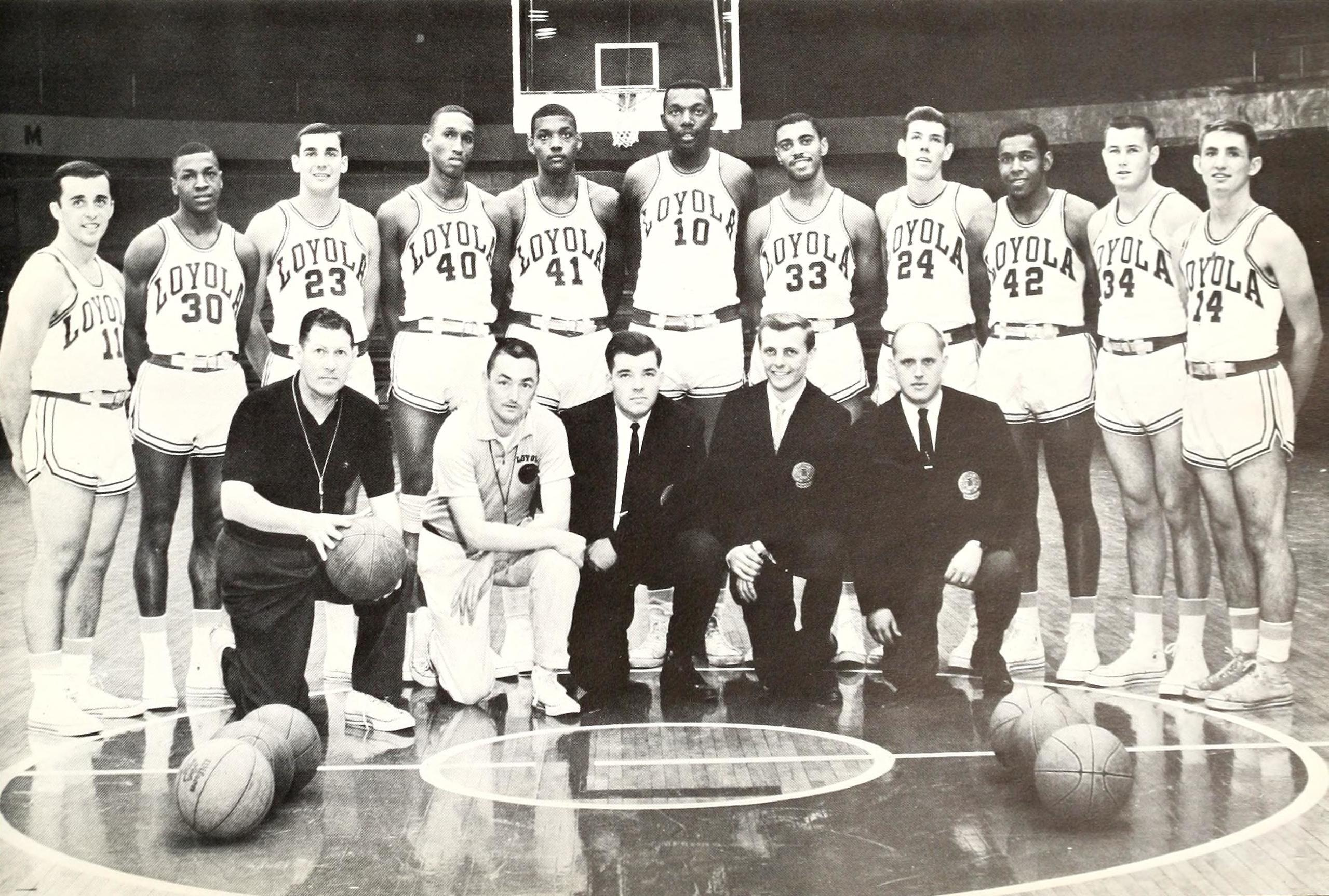

NCAA tournament, Mideast Third Place
- Conference: Independent

Ranking
- Coaches: No. 8
- AP: No. 8
- Record: 22–6
- Head coach: George Ireland (13th season)
- Assistant coach: Jerry Lyne
- Home arena: Alumni Gym

1963–64 NCAA University Division men's basketball independents standings
	Conf.				Overall
Team	W		L	PCT	W		L	PCT
Texas Western		–		–	25	–	3	.893
No. 6 Oregon State		–		–	25	–	4	.862
No. 7 Villanova		–		–	24	–	4	.857
No. 9 DePaul		–		–	21	–	4	.840
No. 8 Loyola Chicago		–		–	22	–	6	.786
Seattle		–		–	22	–	6	.786
Hardin–Simmons		–		–	20	–	6	.769
Providence		–		–	20	–	6	.769
Creighton		–		–	22	–	7	.759
Iona		–		–	15	–	5	.750
Miami (FL)		–		–	20	–	7	.741
Army		–		–	19	–	7	.731
Utah State		–		–	21	–	8	.724
Boston University		–		–	16	–	7	.696
Duquesne		–		–	16	–	7	.696
Penn State		–		–	16	–	7	.696
Pittsburgh		–		–	17	–	8	.680
Syracuse		–		–	17	–	8	.680
Centenary		–		–	16	–	8	.667
St. Bonaventure		–		–	16	–	8	.667
Portland		–		–	17	–	9	.654
Holy Cross		–		–	15	–	8	.652
Colorado State		–		–	16	–	9	.640
NYU		–		–	17	–	10	.630
Houston		–		–	16	–	10	.615
Xavier		–		–	16	–	10	.615
Dayton		–		–	15	–	10	.600
Georgetown		–		–	15	–	10	.600
Louisville		–		–	15	–	10	.600
West Texas State		–		–	13	–	9	.591
Oklahoma City		–		–	15	–	11	.577
Regis		–		–	12	–	9	.571
Detroit		–		–	14	–	11	.560
Memphis State		–		–	14	–	11	.560
St. John's		–		–	14	–	11	.560
Oregon		–		–	14	–	11	.560
Seton Hall		–		–	13	–	12	.520
Butler		–		–	13	–	13	.500
Loyola (LA)		–		–	12	–	12	.500
Manhattan		–		–	11	–	11	.500
Air Force		–		–	11	–	12	.478
Boston College		–		–	10	–	11	.476
Navy		–		–	10	–	12	.455
Fordham		–		–	9	–	11	.450
Florida State		–		–	11	–	14	.440
Canisius		–		–	10	–	14	.417
Notre Dame		–		–	10	–	14	.417
Saint Francis (PA)		–		–	10	–	14	.417
Niagara		–		–	8	–	12	.400
St. Francis (NY)		–		–	10	–	16	.385
New Mexico State		–		–	8	–	15	.348
Colgate		–		–	7	–	16	.304
Denver		–		–	6	–	20	.231
Rutgers		–		–	5	–	17	.227
Marquette		–		–	5	–	21	.192
Rankings from AP Poll

The 1963–64 Loyola Ramblers men's basketball team represented Loyola University Chicago. The head coach was George Ireland. The Ramblers finished with a 22–6 record after finishing as the third place team for the Mideast region of the NCAA tournament.

== Roster ==
1963–64 Loyola Ramblers men's basketball team
Players
Coaches

Pos.	#	Name	Height	Weight	Year	Hometown
G	30	Jim Coleman	5 ft 11 in (1.8 m)	—	So
F	34	Dan Connaughton	6 ft 1 in (1.85 m)	—	Jr
G	11	John Egan (C)	5 ft 10 in (1.78 m)	—	Sr
C	41	Les Hunter	6 ft 7 in (2.01 m)	—	Sr
G	14	Ed Manzke	5 ft 11 in (1.8 m)	—	So
F	24	Tom Markey	—	—	So
F	42	Ron Miller (C)	6 ft 2 in (1.88 m)	—	Sr
F	33	Frank Perez	6 ft 4 in (1.93 m)	—	So
C	10	Rich Rochelle	6 ft 10 in (2.08 m)	—	Sr
F	40	Vic Rouse	6 ft 6 in (1.98 m)	—	Sr
F	23	Chuck Wood	6 ft 3 in (1.91 m)	—	Sr

Head coach

George Ireland

Assistant coach(es)

Jerry Lyne

Legend

- (C) Team captain
- (S) Suspended
- (I) Ineligible
- (W) Walk-on
- Injured
- Current redshirt

Sources: Sports Reference, Loyola yearbook
