= 1963–64 Ohio Bobcats men's basketball team =

American college basketball season

1963–64 Ohio Bobcats men's basketball

MAC Regular Season champions

NCAA tournament, Elite Eight
- Conference: Mid-American Conference
- Record: 21–6 (10–2 MAC)
- Head coach: Jim Snyder (15th season)
- Home arena: Grover Center

1963–64 Mid-American Conference men's basketball standings
	Conf.				Overall
Team	W		L	PCT	W		L	PCT
Ohio	10	–	2	.833	21	–	6	.778
Miami (Ohio)	9	–	3	.750	17	–	7	.708
Bowling Green State	7	–	5	.583	14	–	9	.609
Western Michigan	6	–	6	.500	10	–	14	.417
Kent State	5	–	7	.417	11	–	13	.458
Toledo	4	–	8	.333	13	–	11	.542
Marshall	1	–	11	.083	6	–	17	.261
Rankings from AP Poll

The 1963–64 Ohio Bobcats men's basketball team represented Ohio University as a member of the Mid-American Conference in the college basketball season of 1963–64. The team was coached by Jim Snyder and played their home games at Grover Center. The Bobcats finished the regular season with a record of 19–5 and won MAC regular season title with a conference record of 10–2. They received a bid to the NCAA tournament. There they defeated Louisville and Kentucky before losing to Michigan in the Elite Eight.

== Schedule ==
Date time, TV	Rank^{#}	Opponent^{#}	Result	Record	Site (attendance) city, state
Regular Season
12/2/1963*		Denison	W 73–39	1–0	
12/4/1963*		Morehead State	W 105–84	2–0	
12/7/1963*		at Wisconsin	W 77–76	3–0	
12/9/1963*		Southern Illinois	W 76–69	4–0	
12/14/1963		at Marshall	W 85–69	5–0 (1–0)	
12/17/1963*		at St. John’s	W 58–54	6–0	
12/18/1963*		at Army	L 45–58	6–1	
12/30/1963*		at Louisville	L 61–69	6–2	
MAC regular season
1/4/1964		Bowling Green	W 88–79	7–2 (2–0)	
1/7/1964		at Western Michigan	L 93–95	7–3 (2–1)	
1/11/1964		at Toledo	W 70–65	8–3 (3–1)	
1/15/1964		Miami (OH)	W 67–57	9–3 (4–1)	
1/18/1964*		at St. Francis (PA)	W 85–77	10–3	
1/20/1964*		Muskingum	W 76–58	11–3	
1/25/1964		Western Michigan	W 95–69	12–3 (5–1)	
2/1/1964		at Kent State	W 76–73	13-3 (6–1)	
2/5/1964		Marshall	W 98–82	14–3 (7–1)	
2/8/1964		at Bowling Green	L 69–76	14–4 (7–2)	
2/19/1964		at Miami (OH)	W 63–60	15–4 (8–2)	
2/22/1964		Kent State	W 65–44	16–4 (9–2)	
2/25/1964*		at Morehead State	W 85–67	17–4	
2/29/1964*		Louisville	W 88–79	18–4	
3/3/1964*		at No. 9 Loyola (IL)	L 87–103	18–5	
3/7/1964		Toledo	W 82–76	19–5 (10–2)	
NCAA tournament
3/10/1964*		vs. Louisville	W 71–69 ^{OT}	20–5	
3/13/1964*		vs. No. 4 Kentucky; Sweet Sixteen	W 85–69	21–5	
3/14/1964*		vs. No. 2 Michigan; Elite Eight	L 57–69	21–6	
*Non-conference game. ^{#}Rankings from AP Poll. (#) Tournament seedings in parentheses. All times are in Eastern Time.

== Statistics ==
=== Team statistics ===
Final 1963–64 statistics

Record	Ohio	OPP
Scoring	2083	1885
Scoring Average	77.15	69.81
Field goals – Att	827–1842	738–1827
Free throws – Att	429–681	409–591
Rebounds	1384	1154
Assists		
Turnovers		
Steals		
Blocked Shots		

=== Player statistics ===
			Minutes		Scoring		Total FGs			Free-Throws			Rebounds						
Player	GP	GS	Tot	Avg	Pts	Avg	FG	FGA	Pct	FT	FTA	Pct	Tot	Avg	A	PF	TO	Stl	Blk
Jerry Jackson	27	-			475	17.6	198	418	0.474	79	126	0.627	149	5.5		57			
Don Hilt	27	-			422	15.6	167	325	0.514	88	139	0.633	280	10.4		76			
Paul Storey	27	-			380	14.1	158	346	0.457	64	99	0.646	152	5.6		57			
Mike Haley	27	-			350	13.0	138	366	0.377	74	124	0.597	233	8.6		70			
Charles Gill	27	-			147	5.4	53	115	0.461	41	56	0.732	110	4.1		79			
Tom Davis	27	-			122	4.5	45	90	0.500	32	45	0.711	85	3.1		50			
Lloyd Buck	23	-			61	2.7	25	61	0.410	11	22	0.500	49	2.1		34			
Tom Weirich	26	-			61	2.3	21	57	0.368	19	28	0.679	31	1.2		16			
Ken Brown	19	-			35	1.8	13	34	0.382	9	25	0.360	38	2.0		14			
Joe Barry	11	-			20	1.8	5	9	0.556	10	15	0.667	4	0.4		2			
Gary Lashley	7	-			4	0.6	2	4	0.500	0	0	0.000	6	0.9		2			
Jim Schoon	7	-			4	0.6	1	6	0.167	2	2	1.000	3	0.4		2			
Scott Lawson	7	-			2	0.3	1	5	0.200	0	0	0.000	2	0.3		1			
Bill Sherman	6	-			0	0.0	0	6	0.000	0	0	0.000	2	0.3		3			
Total	27	-	-	-	2083	77.1	827	1842	0.449	429	681	0.630	1384	51.3		463			
Opponents	27	-	-	-	1885	69.8	738	1827	0.404	409	591	0.692	1154	42.7		517			

Legend
GP	Games played	GS	Games started	Avg	Average per game
FG	Field-goals made	FGA	Field-goal attempts	Off	Offensive rebounds
Def	Defensive rebounds	A	Assists	TO	Turnovers
Blk	Blocks	Stl	Steals	High	Team high
