= Steve Courtin =

American basketball player (1942–2022)

Personal information
- Born: September 21, 1942 Philadelphia, Pennsylvania, U.S.
- Died: August 6, 2022 (aged 79) St. Augustine, Florida, U.S.
- Listed height: 6 ft 1 in (1.85 m)
- Listed weight: 188 lb (85 kg)

Career information
- High school: St. James (Chester, Pennsylvania)
- College: Saint Joseph's (1961–1964)
- NBA draft: 1964: 3rd round, 24th overall pick
- Drafted by: Cincinnati Royals
- Playing career: 1965–1967
- Position: Shooting guard
- Number: 5

Career history
- 1965: Philadelphia 76ers
- 1965–1966: Harrisburg Patriots
- 1966–1967: Allentown Jets

Career highlights
- Robert V. Geasey Trophy co-winner (1964)

Career NBA statistics
- Points: 101 (4.2 ppg)
- Rebounds: 22 (0.9 rpg)
- Assists: 22 (0.9 apg)
- Stats at NBA.com
- Stats at Basketball Reference

Stephen Edward Courtin (September 21, 1942 – August 6, 2022) was an American professional basketball player. He played college basketball for Saint Joseph's University, where as a senior in 1963–64 he was co-awarded the Robert V. Geasey Trophy as the Philadelphia Big 5's best player. Courtin was then selected in the 1964 NBA draft by the Cincinnati Royals. He played in 24 games during the 1964–65 season for the Philadelphia 76ers before moving on to two seasons in the Continental Basketball Association.

Courtin died on August 6, 2022, at the age of 79.

== Career statistics ==
Legend
GP	Games played	GS	Games started	MPG	Minutes per game
FG%	Field goal percentage	3P%	3-point field goal percentage	FT%	Free throw percentage
RPG	Rebounds per game	APG	Assists per game	SPG	Steals per game
BPG	Blocks per game	PPG	Points per game	**Bold**	Career high

=== NBA ===
==== Regular season ====
Year	Team	GP	MPG	FG%	FT%	RPG	APG	PPG
1964–65	Philadelphia	24	13.2	.408	.810	.9	.9	4.2
