= Regis Rangers =

- University: Regis University
- Nickname: Rangers
- NCAA: Division II
- Conference: Rocky Mountain Athletic Conference
- Athletic director: Tommy Gilhooly
- Location: Denver, Colorado
- Varsity teams: 14 (6 men's, 8 women's)
- Basketball arena: Regis Fieldhouse
- Baseball stadium: Regis Baseball Field
- Soccer stadium: Regis Match Pitch
- Colors: Navy blue and gold
- Mascot: Regi the Ranger
- Fight song: Leaders of the West
- Website: regisrangers.com
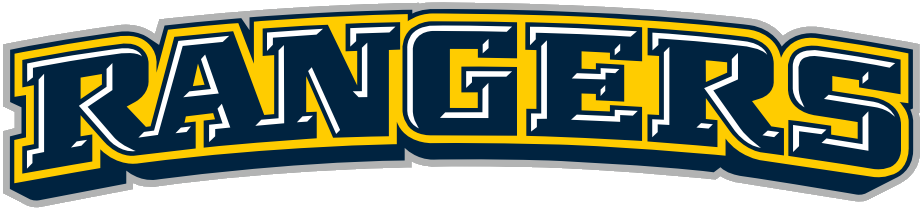

The Regis Rangers are the athletic teams that represent Regis University, located in Denver, Colorado, in NCAA Division II intercollegiate sports. The Rangers compete as members of the Rocky Mountain Athletic Conference for all 14 varsity programs.

== Athletic director ==
In January 2023 Tommy Gilhooly was announced as athletic director. He assumed the role from interim athletic director, Kate Whalen, who helped guide the Rangers into a smooth transition.

David Spafford was the interim athletic director in 2016 and took over the role permanently for seven years from 2016-2022.

Ann Martin was promoted to the position of athletic director in 2010, succeeding Barb Schroeder who retired after being director for nearly fifteen years.

== Varsity sports ==
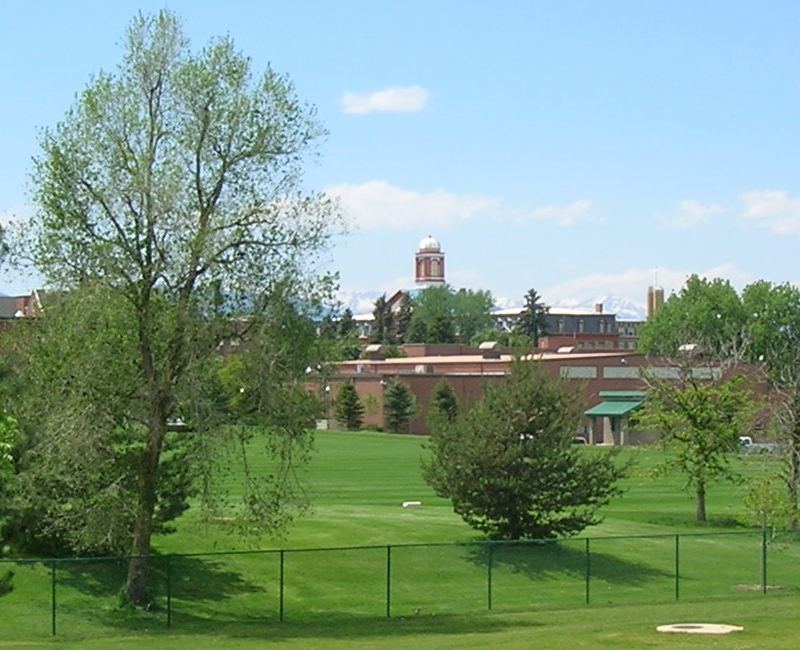
A distant view of the athletic fields, Field House, and Main Hall.

=== Teams ===
Men's sports

- Baseball
- Basketball
- Cross Country
- Soccer
- Outdoor & Indoor Track & Field

Women's sports

- Basketball
- Cross Country
- Lacrosse
- Soccer
- Softball
- Outdoor & Indoor Track & Field
- Volleyball

In the 2024 academic school year, the Regis athletics program saw great success. The Rangers earned RMAC Championships in volleyball, Women's lacrosse, softball, Women's basketball, and Women's Golf. The Women's lacrosse team made the NCAA Final 4 for the third time in program history while the Women's basketball team completed a back-to-back conference championship run which resulted in a berth in the NCAA tournament, where they won their first-round match-up. The baseball program also earned an NCAA tournament bid after a historic season.

It was announced in Spring 2024 that the athletics department was expanding its varsity sport offerings, adding 3 new programs in Men's & Women's track & field and Women's indoor track. All programs will begin in fall 2024.

In Summer 2026, the athletics department again expanded, adding Men's indoor track as a sponsored varsity sport.

=== Men's basketball ===
Regis University's men's basketball program has a rich history marked by significant achievements. The program secured the RMAC regular season championship in the 1977–78 season and won the RMAC Tournament championship in the 2017–18 season.

The Rangers have participated in the NCAA Division II tournament six times: 1956–57, 1957–58, 1994–95, 1995–96, and 2017–18, 2024-25.

Before joining the NCAA, the team reached the National Association of Intercollegiate Athletics (NAIA) semifinals in the 1948–49 and 1950–51 seasons; they were finalists in 1949 and finished fourth in 1951.

The Rangers won the 1949 National Catholic Invitational Tournament, defeating the St. Francis Terriers, 51–47 in the final.

Lonnie Porter served as the Rangers Head coach from 1977 to 2015, leading the program for 38 seasons–the longest coaching tenure in Colorado college basketball history. He compiled a record of 538-503 (.516), making him the winningest coach in both Regis men's basketball and Colorado collegiate basketball history at the time of his retirement. He led them to the 1977-1978 RMAC title earned five conference coach of the year awards, and was named the NCAA DII North Central Region Coach of the Year in 1995. As a head coach, he achieved a 94% graduation rate among his student-athletes. He was inducted into the RMAC Hall of Fame (2004), the Colorado Sports Hall of Fame (2001), and the Regis University Hall of Fame (2019).

Brady Bergeson served as the head coach from 2015-2025, compiling a 164-121 (.575) overall record. During his tenure, the Rangers qualified for the RMAC tournament eight times, won their first RMAC tournament championship in 2017–2018, earned two NCAA DII tournament appearances and recorded four 20-win seasons.

Rex Walters was named the Rangers' next head coach in Summer 2026.

=== Women's Basketball ===
The Rangers Women's basketball program has a storied history marked by significant achievements. The program has secured 5 RMAC regular season titles (2004-05, 2005-06, 2006-07, 2022-23, 2023-24), as well as 4 RMAC Tournament titles (2002-03, 2006-07, 2022-23, 2023-24).

The program has also earned a spot in the NCAA Division II Women's Basketball tournament 8 times (2001-02, 2002-03, 2004-05, 2005-06, 2006-07, 2016-17, 2022-23, 2023-24).

The Rangers were led by head coach Molly Merrin from April 2015 until she stepped down following the 2024/2025 season. Coach Merrin is also a Regis Women's basketball alumni, having played for the Rangers from 2000-2003, earning multiple RMAC honors and she was inducted into the Regis University Hall of Fame in 2015.

As head coach, she led the program to back-to-back RMAC regular season and tournament titles in 2022–2024. She holds coaching record of 156–100 (.609).

Jason Kohler was named the sixth head coach in Regis women's basketball history in 2025, succeeding Molly Merrin. Prior to taking over, Kohler was a graduate assistant and then assistant coach under Merrin.

=== Women's Lacrosse ===
Regis University's women's lacrosse program has demonstrated significant growth and success since its inception in 2000. The team has achieved multiple championships and NCAA tournament appearances, reflecting its competitive excellence.

Considered a Division II powerhouse in Women's lacrosse, the program boasts 7 RMAC regular season titles (2019, 2021, 2022, 2023, 2024, 2025, 2026) and 9 RMAC Tournament titles (2014, 2017, 2019, 2021, 2022, 2023, 2024, 2025, 2026).

The also hold 9 NCAA Tournament appearances (2017, 2018, 2019, 2021, 2022, 2023, 2024, 2025, 2026) and have reached the NCAA Final 4 three times (2018, 2019, 2024).

Sarah Kellner is the head coach of Regis University's women's lacrosse team. She began her tenure in 2006 and has since established an overall record of 224-79 (.739). Under Coach Kellner's leadership, the Regis Rangers have become a dominant force in NCAA Division II women's lacrosse, consistently achieving high rankings and securing multiple championships. Before her coaching career, coach Kellner was standout midfielder for Cornell University. Coach Keller has been recognized as the RMAC Coach of the Year 4 times (2014, 2017, 2019, 2021).

=== Women's Volleyball ===
The Regis University volleyball program was established 1973. This marked the beginning of what would become a historically successful program within NCAA Division II athletics, with numerous conference championships, NCAA tournament appearances, and individual accolades over the years.

The program has won 5 RMAC regular season titles (1997, 1998, 1999, 2017, 2019) and 5 RMAC Tournament titles (1997, 1998, 2008, 2012, 2023).

The Rangers have participated in the NCAA Tournament 5 times, with notable appearances in 2017, 2019 & 2023. The 2017 season saw the team reach the Elite 8.

Joel List was named head coach in 2017. Coach List has earned RMAC Coach of the Year honors 4 times (2017, 2019, 2022, 2023) and AVCA South Central Region Coach of the Year three times (2017, 2019, 2023). He currently boasts a record of 168-61 (.733).

=== Softball ===
The softball program was established in 1998 and have won 2 RMAC regular season titles (2005, 2006) and 6 RMAC Tournament titles (2002, 2005, 2006, 2011, 2015, 2024).

The Rangers have earned 7 NCAA tournament appearances (1998, 2002, 2005, 2006, 2011, 2015, 2024).

Nicole Thompson was the head coach from 2012-2023. During her tenure, she compiled an overall record of 123-129 (.488). She led the team to the 2024 RMAC tournament title.

Candi Letts was hired as the program's next head coach in fall 2024.

=== Baseball ===
The program began in 1968 and has been a member of the RMAC since 1997. The program won the RMAC tournament title in 2012 and has 3 NCAA tournament appearances (1991, 2012, 2024).

Dan McDermott was the head coach from 2008-2013 and guided the team to an RMAC Tournament Championship in 2012 and an NCAA Tournament appearance in the same year.

Drew LaComb was the head coach from 2019-2023. He had an overall record of 87-77 (.530). In 2022, Coach LaComb was awarded the RMAC Coach of the Year after leading the program to its best regular season finish in it joined the conference in 1997.

In 2023, Pat Jolly was elevated to head coach. Coach Jolly has an overall record of 31-24 (.563) as and led the program to its third NCAA appearance in 2024.

The Rangers have had 14 players drafted to the MLB:

- Tim Karns (1993) - drafted in the 11th round by the Baltimore Orioles
- Matt Huff (2006) - drafted in the 27th round by the San Diego Padres
- Pat Farrell (2010) - drafted in the 32nd round by the New York Mets
- Steve Brault (2013) - drafted in the 11th round by the Baltimore Orioles, played 7 seasons, compiled a record of 12-18
- Ethan Sloan (2024) - drafted in the 8th round by the Detroit Tigers

=== Men's Soccer ===
The Rangers Men's soccer program was established in 1990. During the early years, the program achieved 3 Central Athletic Conference (CAC) regular season championships (1991, 1993, 1994).

Since joining the RMAC in 2008, the program has won 2 RMAC regular season titles (2012, 2013) and earned 4 NCAA tournament appearances (2010, 2012, 2013, 2016)

Tony McCall was the head coach from 2008-2021 and compiled an overall record of 132-53-10 (.702). McCall is the all-time leader in men's soccer history with 132 wins in 195 matches. He led the program to 2 RMAC regular season titles and 4 NCAA tournament appearances.

Taylor Diem, a former Regis University men's soccer standout, was named the Head Men's Soccer Coach in October 2021 after spending three seasons as the assistant coach under Tony McCall. He has so far compiled a record of 34-33-8 (.506).

=== Women's Soccer ===
The Women's soccer program was established in 1994 and has a storied history marked by significant achievements.

The Rangers have won 6 RMAC regular season titles (1996, 1999, 2001, 2011, 2012, 2017) and 4 RMAC Tournament titles (2000, 2001, 2003, 2010).

The program has also earned 10 NCAA Tournament appearances (1994, 1996, 2001, 2004, 2005, 2008, 2009, 2010, 2011, 2012) and made the NCAA Final Four twice (1994, 1996).

J.B. Belzer served as head coach for 24 seasons from 1996-2019. He compiled an overall record of 307-140-34 (.673)

Kelly Brown was the head coach from 2020-2022. In her two seasons at the helm, she had an overall record of 18-8-1 (.647).

Jeff Frykholm was hired as the Rangers' head coach in May 2022. He has compiled a record of 39-23-9 (.613). Under Frykholm, the Rangers have reached the RMAC Tournament in each of his first four seasons, including back-to-back RMAC Tournament championship game appearances in 2022 and 2023.

=== Cross Country & Track & Field ===
The Cross-Country program was founded in 2004.

In Spring 2024, it was announced that the university would be expanding its varsity sports offerings to include Men's and Women's Outdoor Track and Women's Indoor Track, to begin with the Winter 2025 season.

Willie Moore was hired in Summer 2024 to become the program's next head XC coach as well as the program's first head track & Field coach.

In Fall 2024, Regis Athletics partnered with the city of Thornton to have Adams 12 5-Star Stadium to be the official home track for the Rangers Inaugural season.

== Facilities & Renovations ==
=== Regis Turf Fields ===
Completed in the spring of 2022, these two illuminated artificial turf fields were made possible through a partnership between Regis University, Arrupe Jesuit High School, and Shea Homes. They serve the Arrupe Generals soccer teams and the Regis Rangers lacrosse, soccer, and rugby teams.

=== Berce Athletic Center ===
Opened in 2019, this center was funded by a $1.4 million donation from Dan and Annie Berce. It features two full basketball courts, volleyball courts, and auxiliary centers for athletic training and strength and conditioning.

=== James Hillman Varsity Weight Room ===
Renovated between May and August 2023, this facility now includes six customizable racks, two cable machines, a new personalized rubber floor, and new sets of branded free weights and kettlebells.

=== Regis Batting Instruction Center & Weight Room ===
Regis University's hitting facility, known as the Regis Batting Instruction (RBI) Center, was established by converting a former on-campus pool into a dedicated indoor hitting and pitching space. This 4,750-square-foot facility provides the baseball and softball programs with a dedicated practice area during inclement weather or breaks throughout the day.

In Summer 2023, along with the renovation of the James Hillman Varsity Weight Room, the RBI Center was renovated to include a secondary weight room.

=== Rangers Indoor Cardio Room & Speed Zone ===
A dedicated cardio room located within the Regis Fieldhouse. Formerly racquetball courts, this space was redesigned and renovated in the summer of 2024 to serve as the Rangers Indoor Cardio Room. The facility features 12 Kaiser M3 Spin Bikes, 2 Life Fitness Ellipticals, 3 Woodway Treadmills, a 55" Smart TV, gym mirrors, rubber and turf flooring, and disco lighting, providing athletes with a safe and engaging environment for cardiovascular training year-round. In Summer 2025, the Speed Zone was built. The Ranger Speed Zone is a dedicated indoor track sprint area located within the fieldhouse. This space acts as a sprint, block start and plyometric area for XC/Track practice use during the Winter months.

== Notable alumni ==
- Bill Murray - Actor & Comedian
- Dr. Yadira Caraveo - former member of the U.S House of Representatives from Colorado's 8th district
