= Oklahoma City Stars men's basketball =

2025–26 Oklahoma City Stars men's basketball team
- University: Oklahoma City University
- Head coach: Vacant
- Location: Oklahoma City, Oklahoma
- Arena: Abe Lemons Arena (capacity: 3,500)
- Conference: Sooner Athletic Conference
- Nickname: Stars
- Colors: Blue and white

NCAA Division I tournament Elite Eight
- 1956, 1957
Other NCAA Division I tournament results
Sweet Sixteen	1952, 1953, 1956, 1957, 1963, 1965
Appearances	1952, 1953, 1954, 1955, 1956, 1957, 1963, 1964, 1965, 1966, 1973

NAIA tournament champions
- 1991, 1992, 1994, 1996, 2007, 2008

Conference tournament champions
- Midwestern City Conference; 1981; Sooner Athletic Conference; 1994, 1995, 1999, 2000, 2002, 2003, 2006, 2008, 2013, 2019, 2026

The Oklahoma City Stars men's basketball team is the basketball team that represents Oklahoma City University (OCU) in Oklahoma City, Oklahoma, United States. The school's team currently competes in the Sooner Athletic Conference of the National Association of Intercollegiate Athletics (NAIA).

== History ==
Oklahoma City competed in the National Collegiate Athletic Association's (NCAA's) Division I for many years, and the program was especially noted for its success under coaches Doyle Parrack (1950–1955) and his successor Abe Lemons (1955–1973 and 1984–1990). OCU appeared in eleven NCAA Division I men's basketball tournaments.

As an NCAA Division I team, OCU was an independent team until joining the Midwestern City Conference (MCC), now known as the Horizon League. In 1985, the school moved from the NCAA to the National Association of Intercollegiate Athletics (NAIA), citing as reasons for the move the number of sports the NCAA required at member schools, the MCC's insistence that teams host their games in arenas with seating capacities greater than 7,500, and the concerns of other MCC members that OCU lacked geographic proximity to their institutions. Since the move to the NAIA, OCU had joined the Sooner Athletic Conference (SAC) in the 1986–87 school year, which they still compete to this day, and has won six national championships.

In 1998, OCU changed the name of its athletic teams from Chiefs to Stars.

== National championships ==
Year	Coach	Runner-up	Score
1991	Darrel Johnson	Central Arkansas Bears	77–74
1992	Darrel Johnson	Central Arkansas Bears	82–73
1994	Win Case	Life Running Eagles	99–81
1996	Win Case	Georgetown Tigers	86–80
2007	Ray Harper	Concordia Eagles	79–71
2008	Ray Harper	Mountain State Cougars	75–72
National Championships (total)			6

== Tournament results ==
=== NCAA tournament results ===
The Chiefs appeared in 11 NCAA Division I basketball tournaments from 1952 to 1973, making them the most prolific tournament team that is no longer in Division I. Their record in tournaments was 8–13, giving them the second most wins (after New York University) among teams no longer in Division I.

Year	Seed	Round	Opponent	Result
1952		Sweet Sixteen; Regional Third Place	Wyoming; UCLA	L 48–54; W 55–53
1953		Sweet Sixteen; Regional Third Place	Kansas; TCU	L 65–73; L 56–58
1954		First Round	Bradley	L 55–61
1955		First Round	Bradley	L 65–69
1956		First Round; Sweet Sixteen; Elite Eight	Memphis State; Kansas State; SMU	W 97–81; W 97–93; L 63–84
1957		First Round; Sweet Sixteen; Elite Eight	Loyola (LA); Saint Louis; Kansas	W 76–55; W 75–66; L 61–81
1963		First Round; Sweet Sixteen; Regional Third Place	Colorado State; Colorado; Texas	W 70–67; L 72–78; L 83–90
1964		First Round	Creighton	L 78–89
1965		First Round; Sweet Sixteen; Regional Third Place	Colorado State; San Francisco; BYU	W 70–68; L 67–91; W 112–102
1966		First Round	Texas Western	L 74–89
1973		First Round	Arizona State	L 78–103

=== NIT results ===
The Chiefs played in the National Invitation Tournament twice.

Year	Seed	Round	Opponent	Result
1959		Quarterfinals	NYU	L 48–63
1968		First Round	Duke	L 81–97

=== NAIA results ===
Year	Seed	Round	Opponent	Result
1987	1	First Round; Second Round	Northwood (16) Georgetown (KY)	W 101–66; L 64–67
1991	2	First Round; Second Round; Elite Eight; Fab Four; National Championship	Concordia (NE) (15) Concord; St. Mary's (MI) (6) Pfeiffer (5) Central Arkansas	W 80–77; W 107–85; W 112–94; W 100–83; W 77–74
1992	1	First Round; Second Round; Elite Eight; Fab Four; National Championship	Columbia Union (16) Urbana; Cumberlands (5) Pfeiffer (7) Central Arkansas	W 107–73; W 96–89; W 97–63; W 102–92; W 82–73
1993	6	First Round; Second Round	Spring Hill; Lenoir–Rhyne	W 84–79; L 67–85
1994	5	First Round; Second Round; Elite Eight; Fab Four; National Championship	Siena Heights; St. Mary's (TX) (4) Drury (16) Oklahoma Baptist; Life	W 104–99; W 86–75; W 90–70; W 86–85; W 99–81
1995	3	First Round; Second Round; Elite Eight	Iowa Wesleyan (14) Transylvania (11) Pfeiffer	W 107–75; W 98–67; L 78–92
1996	14	First Round; Second Round; Elite Eight; Fab Four; National Championship	St. Xavier (3) The Master’s (6) Birmingham–Southern; Belmont (1) Georgetown (KY)	W 94–58; W 108–85; W 82–66; W 80–77; W 86–80
1998	8	First Round; Second Round	The Master’s (9) Incarnate Word	W 84–73; L 52–63
1999	6	First Round; Second Round	Houston Baptist; Life	W 61–59; L 74–87
2000	5	First Round; Second Round	Westmont (12) Spring Hill	W 70–62; L 67–77
2001	–	First Round; Second Round	(15) Xavier (LA) (2) Azusa Pacific	W 91–69; L 54–94
2002	16	First Round; Second Round; Elite Eight	Houston Baptist (1) Georgetown (KY) (9) Azusa Pacific	W 88–82; W 74–59; L 72–80
2003	–	First Round	(9) St. Xavier	L 56–82
2004	–	First Round; Second Round; Elite Eight	(7) Columbia (MO) (10) Lewis–Clark State (15) Mobile	W 81–48; W 79–65; L 62–75
2005	–	First Round; Second Round	(6) Mobile; Carroll (MT)	W 77–74; L 65–66
2006	7	First Round; Second Round; Elite Eight; Fab Four; National Championship	Columbia (MO) (10) Houston Baptist; Lindsey Wilson (3) Robert Morris (IL); Texas Wesleyan	W 91–64; W 99–77; W 77–67; W 94–92; L 65–67
2007	2	First Round; Second Round; Elite Eight; Fab Four; National Championship	Wiley (15) Illinois–Springfield (10) Azusa Pacific; Faulkner (4) Concordia (CA)	W 90–74; W 90–78; W 84–68; W 76–61; W 79–71
2008	7	First Round; Second Round; Elite Eight; Fab Four; National Championship	Cumberland (10) California Baptist (2) Lee; Campbellsville (5) Mountain State	W 81–64; W 69–63; W 86–66; W 78–64; W 75–72
2010	16	First Round	Southern Poly	L 70–78
2013	–	First Round	(1) Columbia (MO)	L 37–68
2015	–	First Round	(10) Concordia (CA)	L 62–74
2016	6	First Round	(3) MidAmerica Nazarene	L 82–87 (OT)
2017	7	First Round	(2) Dillard	L 65–86
2018	2	First Round; Second Round	(7) Xavier (LA) (3) Georgetown (KY)	W 65–50; L 83–91
2019	7	First Round; Second Round	(2) Stillman (3) Carroll (MT)	W 101–84; L 69–80

Note: The NAIA shifted from national to regional seeds in 2016.

== Frederickson Fieldhouse ==
Frederickson Fieldhouse was an athletic facility on the campus of Oklahoma City University built in honor of a major OCU benefactor, George Frederickson of Oklahoma City. In his gift to OCU, Frederickson stipulated that the building should be built by his nephew, John Henry Frederickson. Accordingly, it was built by the John Henry Frederickson Jr. Construction Company, also of Oklahoma City, with John Henry Frederickson was the general contractor. John Henry Frederickson's son Chris Frederickson also worked on the job as a laborer.

Frederickson Field House was a 20,000-square-foot (1,900 m^{2}) facility. At the time of its construction in 1959 it the largest hyperbolic paraboloid structure in the world. The Frederickson company was a pioneer in the design and building of extremely thin-shell concrete buildings, of which Frederickson Field House was one. Another famous thin-shell concrete structure built by John Henry Frederickson was the First Christian Church in Oklahoma City, a building has an "eggshell"-shaped roof that is actually thinner in proportion than a real eggshell.

Frederickson Field House held 3,400 for basketball. Asked why the scoreboard at the Field House was the first one to have a three-digit capability for game scores, Abe Lemons, the head coach at the time, said "Come to the first game and you will find out." Teams rarely scored in the 100s at the time (the late 1950s), but in the first game at Frederickson Field House OCU beat Florida State, scoring 129 points in the game. The Chiefs went on to become one of the highest-scoring teams in the United States, scoring over 100 points a game on many occasions.

Frederickson Field House was replaced with the more modern Henry J. Freede Wellness and Activities Center — named for Henry J. Freede — in 2000, and was torn down in 2005.
