= 1976–77 Arkansas Razorbacks men's basketball team =

American college basketball season

1976–77 Arkansas Razorbacks men's basketball

Southwest Conference Champions Southwest Conference tournament champions

NCAA tournament, First Round
- Conference: Southwest Conference

Ranking
- AP: No. 19
- Record: 26–2 (16–0 SWC)
- Head coach: Eddie Sutton (3rd season)
- Home arena: Barnhill Arena (Capacity: 6,200)

1976–77 Southwest Conference men's basketball standings
	Conf.				Overall
Team	W		L	PCT	W		L	PCT
No. 18 Arkansas†	16	–	0	1.000	26	–	2	.929
Houston	13	–	3	.813	29	–	8	.784
Texas Tech	12	–	4	.750	20	–	9	.690
Texas	8	–	8	.500	13	–	13	.500
Texas A&M	8	–	8	.500	14	–	14	.500
SMU	7	–	9	.438	8	–	19	.296
Baylor	5	–	11	.313	11	–	17	.393
Rice	3	–	13	.188	9	–	18	.333
TCU	0	–	16	.000	3	–	23	.115
† 1977 SWC tournament winner Rankings from AP Poll

The 1976–77 Arkansas Razorbacks men's basketball team represented the University of Arkansas in the 1976–77 college basketball season. The Razorbacks played their home games in Barnhill Arena in Fayetteville, Arkansas. It was Eddie Sutton's third season as head coach of the Hogs. The 1976–77 season was the second for Arkansas featuring "The Triplets," the famed trio of Ron Brewer, Marvin Delph, and Sidney Moncrief, who led the team and program into an eighteen-game winning streak and national relevance. The Razorbacks won the Southwest Conference regular season championship with a perfect conference record of 16–0, Arkansas's third and most recent perfect conference season, and an overall record of 26-2. The Razorbacks went on to win the 1977 SWC Conference tournament against Houston, Arkansas's first conference tournament championship after being a semifinalist in the SWC's inaugural basketball tournament the season before. The 1976–77 season was the first of six times that the Hogs would capture both the regular season and tournament titles in the SWC.

The Razorbacks clinched their bid to the NCAA tournament with their SWC Tournament victory, guaranteeing Arkansas's fifth appearance in the tournament overall and first since 1958. The Hogs were upset by Wake Forest in the first round of the tournament, bringing a disappointing end to a historic season.

Arkansas entered the AP Poll at #19 on December 13, 1976, the first time the Hogs were ranked since 1958. The Razorbacks had only been ranked for a cumulative total of four weeks prior to this season, but would remain ranked for the rest of the season, including finishing ranked for the first time in school history, coming in at #19 after spending fourteen weeks in the polls and reaching a peak ranking of #6 on February 21, 1977.

Guard Ron Brewer was named a Helms All-American, as well as picking up First-Team All-SWC honors. Guard Sidney Moncrief garnered Honorable Mention All-American recognition from the AP and The Sporting News, while also being recognized as a First-Team All-SWC player. Forward Marvin Delph joined Brewer and Moncrief on the All-SWC First Team.

The team featured future Arkansas football head coach, Houston Dale Nutt Jr., a freshman guard from Little Rock Central High School.

== Roster ==
1976–77 Arkansas Razorbacks men's basketball team
Players
Coaches

Pos.	#	Name	Height	Weight	Year	Previous school	Hometown
F	44	Marvin Delph	6 ft 4 in (1.93 m)	180 lb (82 kg)	Jr	Conway High School	Conway, Arkansas
G	10	Ron Brewer	6 ft 4 in (1.93 m)	180 lb (82 kg)	Jr	Northside High School; Westark Junior College	Fort Smith, Arkansas
G	32	Sidney Moncrief	6 ft 4 in (1.93 m)	190 lb (86 kg)	So	Hall High School	Little Rock, Arkansas
G	14	Chris Bennett (injured)	6 ft 5 in (1.96 m)	190 lb (86 kg)	So	Catholic High School for Little Boys	Little Rock, Arkansas
F	42	Jim Counce	6 ft 7 in (2.01 m)	196 lb (89 kg)	Jr	White Station High School	Memphis, Tennessee
C	30	Steve Schall	6 ft 10 in (2.08 m)	220 lb (100 kg)	So	Raytown South High School	Raytown, Missouri
C	40	Steve Stroud	6 ft 10 in (2.08 m)	232 lb (105 kg)	RS Sr	Highland High School	Horseshoe Bend, Arkansas
F	22	Ray Buckner	6 ft 4 in (1.93 m)	200 lb (91 kg)	Jr	Pine Bluff High School	Pine Bluff, Arkansas
G	34	Trey Trumbo	6 ft 4 in (1.93 m)	178 lb (81 kg)	So	Fayetteville High School	Fayetteville, Arkansas
F	12	Cam McClary (W)	6 ft 5 in (1.96 m)	185 lb (84 kg)	Fr	Marshfield High School	Marshfield, Wisconsin
F	20	Alan Zahn	6 ft 7 in (2.01 m)	200 lb (91 kg)	Fr	Manzano High School	Albuquerque, New Mexico
C	54	Ken Gehring	6 ft 9 in (2.06 m)	210 lb (95 kg)	Jr	Springfield High School; North Carolina State; Cumberland Junior College	Akron, Ohio
G	21	Houston Nutt	6 ft 1 in (1.85 m)	197 lb (89 kg)	Fr	Little Rock Central High School	Little Rock, Arkansas
F	24	Lawson Pilgrim	6 ft 5 in (1.96 m)	180 lb (82 kg)	Fr	Conway High School	Conway, Arkansas

Head coach

Eddie Sutton (Oklahoma State)

Assistant coach(es)

Legend

- (C) Team captain
- (S) Suspended
- (I) Ineligible
- (W) Walk-on
- Injured
- Current redshirt

Roster
Last update: August 17, 2022

== Schedule and results ==
Schedule retrieved from HogStats.com.

Date time, TV	Rank^{#}	Opponent^{#}	Result	Record	Site city, state
Exhibition
November 10, 1976		Brazil	W 97–69	0–0	Pine Bluff Convention Center; Pine Bluff, Arkansas
Regular season
November 27, 1976*		Air Force	W 72–54	1–0	Barton Coliseum; Little Rock, Arkansas
November 29, 1976*		Cal State East Bay	W 89–59	2–0	Barnhill Arena; Fayetteville, Arkansas
December 1, 1976*		at Southwest Missouri State College	W 72–71	3–0	Hammons Student Center; Springfield, Missouri
December 4, 1976*		Southern Colorado State College	W 91–43	4–0	Barnhill Arena; Fayetteville, Arkansas
December 11, 1976*		Oklahoma City	W 71–60	5–0	Barnhill Arena; Fayetteville, Arkansas
December 18, 1976*	No. 19	at Kansas	W 67–63	6–0	Allen Fieldhouse; Lawrence, Kansas
December 20, 1976*	No. 19	Kansas State	W 80–65	7–0	Barnhill Arena; Fayetteville, Arkansas
December 23, 1976*	No. 18	at Tulsa	W 81–66	8–0	Tulsa Convention Center; Tulsa, Oklahoma
December 30, 1976*	No. 17	Memphis State	L 62–69	8–1	Barton Coliseum; Little Rock, Arkansas
January 4, 1977	No. 18	at Texas Tech	W 41–38	9–1 (1–0)	Lubbock Municipal Coliseum; Lubbock, Texas
January 8, 1977	No. 18	Houston	W 81–70	10–1 (2–0)	Barnhill Arena; Fayetteville, Arkansas
January 10, 1977	No. 18	Texas Tech	W 60–53	11–1 (3–0)	Barnhill Arena; Fayetteville, Arkansas
January 15, 1977	No. 17	at Rice	W 72–45	12–1 (4–0)	Tudor Fieldhouse; Houston, Texas
January 18, 1977	No. 17	TCU	W 62–45	13–1 (5–0)	Barnhill Arena; Fayetteville, Arkansas
January 22, 1977	No. 17	at Texas	W 86–58	14–1 (6–0)	Gregory Gymnasium; Austin, Texas
January 24, 1977	No. 17	Texas A&M	W 72–58	15–1 (7–0)	Barnhill Arena; Fayetteville, Arkansas
January 27, 1977	No. 15	at SMU	W 77–59	16–1 (8–0)	Moody Coliseum; Dallas, Texas
January 29, 1977	No. 15	at Baylor	W 68–59	17–1 (9–0)	Heart O' Texas Fair Coliseum; Waco, Texas
February 2, 1977	No. 14	SMU	W 81–58	18–1 (10–0)	Barnhill Arena; Fayetteville, Arkansas
February 5, 1977	No. 14	at Houston	W 82–80	19–1 (11–0)	Hofheinz Pavilion; Houston, Texas
February 7, 1977*	No. 14	at Tulane	W 76–73	20–1 (11–0)	Devlin Fieldhouse; New Orleans, Louisiana
February 10, 1977	No. 13	Baylor	W 77–57	21–1 (12–0)	Barnhill Arena; Fayetteville, Arkansas
February 12, 1977	No. 11	Rice	W 78–51	22–1 (13–0)	Barnhill Arena; Fayetteville, Arkansas
February 15, 1977	No. 11	at TCU	W 79–64	23–1 (14–0)	Daniel-Meyer Coliseum; Fort Worth, Texas
February 19, 1977	No. 11	Texas	W 73–61	24–1 (15–0)	Barnhill Arena; Fayetteville, Arkansas
February 22, 1977	No. 6	at Texas A&M	W 63–62	25–1 (16–0)	G. Rollie White Coliseum; College Station, Texas
SWC tournament
March 5, 1977*	No. 6	vs. Houston; Championship	W 84–70	26–1 (16–0)	The Summit; Houston, Texas
NCAA tournament
March 12, 1977*	No. 8	vs. Wake Forest; First Round	L 80–86	26–2 (16–0)	Lloyd Noble Center; Norman, Oklahoma
*Non-conference game. ^{#}Rankings from AP Poll. (#) Tournament seedings in parentheses. All times are in Central Time.
