= 1978–79 Iowa State Cyclones men's basketball team =

American college basketball season

1978–79 Iowa State Cyclones men's basketball
- Conference: Big Eight Conference
- Record: 11–16 (6–8 Big Eight)
- Head coach: Lynn Nance (3rd season)
- Home arena: Hilton Coliseum

1978–79 Big Eight Conference men's basketball standings
	Conf.				Overall
Team	W		L	PCT	W		L	PCT
No. 16 Oklahoma †	10	–	4	.714	21	–	10	.677
Missouri	8	–	6	.571	13	–	15	.464
Kansas State	8	–	6	.571	16	–	12	.571
Kansas	8	–	6	.571	18	–	11	.621
Nebraska	7	–	7	.500	14	–	13	.519
Iowa State	6	–	8	.429	11	–	16	.407
Oklahoma State	5	–	9	.357	12	–	15	.444
Colorado	4	–	10	.286	14	–	13	.519
† 1979 Big Eight tournament winner Rankings from AP Poll

The 1978–79 Iowa State Cyclones men's basketball team represented Iowa State University during the 1978–79 NCAA Division I men's basketball season. The Cyclones were coached by Lynn Nance, who was in his third season with the Cyclones.They played their home games at Hilton Coliseum in Ames, Iowa.

They finished the season 11–16, 6–8 in Big Eight play to finish in sixth place. The Cyclones lost in the first round of the Big Eight tournament to Kansas, falling 91–70.

== Roster ==
1978–79 Iowa State Cyclones men's basketball team
Players
Coaches

Pos.	#	Name	Height	Weight	Year	Hometown
F		Bill Buchanan	6 ft 6 in (1.98 m)	210 lb (95 kg)	Jr	Campbellsville, Kentucky
G		Eric Davis	6 ft 3 in (1.91 m)	185 lb (84 kg)	Fr	Chicago
F		Robert Estes	6 ft 6 in (1.98 m)	190 lb (86 kg)	Fr	Liberty, Missouri
G		Carlton Evans (C)	6 ft 1 in (1.85 m)	175 lb (79 kg)	Sr	Macon, GA
F		Bob Fowler	6 ft 5 in (1.96 m)	197 lb (89 kg)	Jr	Westland, Michigan
G		Joe Gideon	6 ft 3 in (1.91 m)	185 lb (84 kg)	So	Forsyth, Missouri
C		Ivan Gruhl	6 ft 9 in (2.06 m)	220 lb (100 kg)	So	Everett, WA
C		Chuck Harmison	6 ft 9 in (2.06 m)	218 lb (99 kg)	Sr	Ames, Iowa
G		Charles Harris	6 ft 2 in (1.88 m)	175 lb (79 kg)	So	Macon, GA
F		John Kunnert	6 ft 6 in (1.98 m)	200 lb (91 kg)	Fr	Dubuque, Iowa
G		Jon Ness	6 ft 2 in (1.88 m)	180 lb (82 kg)	So	Story City, Iowa
G		Andrew Parker (C)	6 ft 5 in (1.96 m)	205 lb (93 kg)	Sr	Fort Lauderdale, Florida
G		John Tillo	6 ft 4 in (1.93 m)	200 lb (91 kg)	Jr	Sioux City, Iowa
C		Dean Uthoff	6 ft 11 in (2.11 m)	247 lb (112 kg)	Jr	Cedar Rapids, Iowa
G		Chuckie White	6 ft 4 in (1.93 m)	195 lb (88 kg)	Fr	St. Louis, Missouri

Head coach

- Lynn Nance

Assistant coach(es)

Legend

- (C) Team captain
- (S) Suspended
- (I) Ineligible
- (W) Walk-on
- Injured
- Current redshirt

== Schedule and results ==
Date time, TV	Rank^{#}	Opponent^{#}	Result	Record	Site city, state
Exhibition
November 9, 1978*; 7:35 pm		Athletes in Action; Exhibition	L 78–92		Hilton Coliseum (4,000); Ames, Iowa
Regular season
November 24, 1978*; 7:35 pm		Northeastern Illinois	W 129–69	1–0	Hilton Coliseum (5,200); Ames, Iowa
December 1, 1978*; 7:30 pm		at Creighton	L 54–55	1–1	Omaha Civic Auditorium (8,238); Omaha, Nebraska
December 4, 1978*; 7:35 pm		Drake; Iowa Big Four	L 77–86	1–2	Hilton Coliseum (10,000); Ames, Iowa
December 7, 1978*; 7:35 pm		San Jose State	W 91–73	2–2	Hilton Coliseum (6,100); Ames, Iowa
December 11, 1978*; 7:30 pm		at Iowa; CyHawk Rivalry	L 66–67	2–3	Iowa Fieldhouse (13,210); Iowa City, Iowa
December 16, 1978*; 7:35 pm		Northwest Missouri State	W 77–54	3–3	Hilton Coliseum (6,500); Ames, Iowa
December 18, 1978*; 7:35 pm		at Mississippi State	L 70–80	3–4	Mississippi Coliseum (7,458); Jackson, Mississippi
December 20, 1978*; 2:00 pm		at Alabama-Birmingham	L 65–79	3–5	Birmingham Civic Center (6,846); Birmingham, Alabama
December 27, 1978*; 9:05 pm		vs. No. 18 Kansas; Big Eight Holiday Tournament quarterfinals	L 55–75	3–6	Kemper Arena (9,478); Kansas City, Missouri
December 29, 1978*; 1:00 pm		vs. Kansas State; Big Eight Holiday Tournament Consolation Semis	W 62–61	4–6	Kemper Arena (6,500); Kansas City, Missouri
December 30, 1978*; 7:05 pm		vs. Oklahoma State; Big Eight Holiday Tournament Consolation Fifth Place	L 75–87	4–7	Kemper Arena (16,000); Kansas City, Missouri
January 3, 1979*; 7:35 pm		Mankato State	W 102–63	5–7	Hilton Coliseum (6,500); Ames, Iowa
January 6, 1979; 12:40 pm, Big Eight		Nebraska	L 68–72	5–8 (0–1)	Hilton Coliseum (7,100); Ames, Iowa
January 13, 1979; 7:35 pm		at Kansas State	W 79–66	6–8 (1–1)	Ahearn Fieldhouse (5,280); Manhattan, Kansas
January 17, 1979; 7:35 pm		Colorado	W 60–59	7–8 (2–1)	Hilton Coliseum (7,580); Ames, Iowa
January 20, 1979; 7:35 pm		Oklahoma State	W 72–70	8–8 (3–1)	Hilton Coliseum (10,200); Ames, Iowa
January 24, 1979; 7:35 pm		at Kansas	L 71–80	8–9 (3–2)	Allen Fieldhouse (12,640); Lawrence, Kansas
January 27, 1979; 4:00 pm		at Oklahoma	L 83–98	8–10 (3–3)	Lloyd Noble Center (5,697); Norman, Oklahoma
January 31, 1979; 7:35 pm		Missouri	L 80–84 ^{OT}	8–11 (3–4)	Hilton Coliseum (8,500); Ames, Iowa
February 3, 1979; 2:38 pm, Big Eight		Kansas State	L 60–62	8–12 (3–5)	Hilton Coliseum (9,200); Ames, Iowa
February 7, 1979; 8:35 pm		at Colorado	L 71–78	8–13 (3–6)	Balch Fieldhouse (3,200); Boulder, Colorado
February 10, 1979; 7:35 pm		at Nebraska	W 48–46	9–13 (4–6)	Devaney Sports Center (14,554); Lincoln, Nebraska
February 14, 1979; 7:35 pm		Kansas	W 68–66	10–13 (5–6)	Hilton Coliseum (10,100); Ames, Iowa
February 17, 1979; 3:00 pm		at Oklahoma State	L 58–73	10–14 (5–7)	Gallagher Hall (5,600); Stillwater, Oklahoma
February 21, 1979; 7:35 pm		Oklahoma	W 66–65	11–14 (6–7)	Hilton Coliseum (10,100); Ames, Iowa
February 24, 1979; 12:40 pm, Big Eight		at Missouri	L 67–73	11–15 (6–8)	Hearnes Center (7,460); Columbia, Missouri
Big Eight tournament
February 27, 1979; 7:35 pm	(6)	at (3) Kansas; Big Eight tournament quarterfinals	L 70–91	11–16	Allen Fieldhouse (5,825); Lawrence, Kansas
*Non-conference game. ^{#}Rankings from AP poll. (#) Tournament seedings in parentheses. All times are in Central Time.
