= 1976–77 Iowa State Cyclones men's basketball team =

American college basketball season

1976–77 Iowa State Cyclones men's basketball
- Conference: Big Eight Conference
- Record: 8–19 (3–11 Big Eight)
- Head coach: Lynn Nance (1st season)
- Assistant coach: Dave Harshman
- Home arena: Hilton Coliseum

1976–77 Big Eight Conference men's basketball standings
	Conf.				Overall
Team	W		L	PCT	W		L	PCT
No. 16 Kansas State †	11	–	3	.786	23	–	8	.742
Missouri	9	–	5	.643	21	–	8	.724
Oklahoma	9	–	5	.643	18	–	10	.643
Kansas	8	–	6	.571	18	–	10	.643
Nebraska	7	–	7	.500	15	–	14	.517
Colorado	5	–	9	.357	11	–	16	.407
Oklahoma State	4	–	10	.286	10	–	17	.370
Iowa State	3	–	11	.214	7	–	20	.259
† 1977 Big Eight tournament winner Rankings from AP Poll

The 1976–77 Iowa State Cyclones men's basketball team represented Iowa State University during the 1976–77 NCAA Division I men's basketball season. The Cyclones were coached by Lynn Nance, who was in his first season with the Cyclones. They played their home games at Hilton Coliseum in Ames, Iowa.

They finished the season 8–19, 3–11 in Big Eight play to finish in last place. The Cyclones lost in the first round of the Big Eight tournament to first seeded Kansas State, falling 97–62.

== Roster ==
1976–77 Iowa State Cyclones men's basketball team
Players
Coaches

Pos.	#	Name	Height	Weight	Year	Hometown
G		Leonard Allen	6 ft 4 in (1.93 m)	195 lb (88 kg)	Jr	Flint, Michigan
F		Steve Burgason (C)	6 ft 6 in (1.98 m)	210 lb (95 kg)	Jr	Ames, Iowa
G		Roman Butkus	6 ft 2 in (1.88 m)	180 lb (82 kg)	Sr	Chicago
F		Ricky Byrdsong	6 ft 6 in (1.98 m)	190 lb (86 kg)	Jr	Atlanta, GA
F		Al Dixon	6 ft 5 in (1.96 m)	215 lb (98 kg)	Jr	East St. Louis, Illinois
G		Carlton Evans	6 ft 1 in (1.85 m)	175 lb (79 kg)	So	Macon, GA
F		Calvin Freeman	6 ft 5 in (1.96 m)	190 lb (86 kg)	Sr	Dayton, Ohio
F		Chuck Harmison	6 ft 7 in (2.01 m)	185 lb (84 kg)	Fr	Ames, Iowa
F		Paul Landsberger	6 ft 7 in (2.01 m)	210 lb (95 kg)	So	St. Paul, Minnesota
C		Jim Murphy	6 ft 7 in (2.01 m)	195 lb (88 kg)	Jr	Treynor, Iowa
F		Andrew Parker	6 ft 4 in (1.93 m)	185 lb (84 kg)	So	Fort Lauderdale, Florida
G		John Tillo	6 ft 4 in (1.93 m)	190 lb (86 kg)	Fr	Sioux City, Iowa
C		Dean Uthoff	6 ft 11 in (2.11 m)	225 lb (102 kg)	Fr	Cedar Rapids, Iowa
G		Evan Varley	6 ft 4 in (1.93 m)	180 lb (82 kg)	Sr	Menlo, Iowa

Head coach

- Lynn Nance

Assistant coach(es)

Dave Harshman

Legend

- (C) Team captain
- (S) Suspended
- (I) Ineligible
- (W) Walk-on
- Injured
- Current redshirt

== Schedule and results ==
Date time, TV	Rank^{#}	Opponent^{#}	Result	Record	Site city, state
Regular season
November 30, 1976*; 7:35 pm		Saint Louis	W 62–47	1–0	Hilton Coliseum; Ames, Iowa
December 4, 1976*; 10:15 pm		at No. 6 UNLV	L 80–115	1–1	Las Vegas Convention Center; Las Vegas, Nevada
December 11, 1976*; 7:35 pm		Tulsa	L 65–88	1–2	Hilton Coliseum; Ames, Iowa
December 13, 1976*; 7:35 pm		California	W 78–70	2–2	Hilton Coliseum; Ames, Iowa
December 16, 1976*; 7:35 pm		Arizona State	W 79–65	3–2	Hilton Coliseum; Ames, Iowa
December 18, 1976*; 7:35 pm		at Iowa; CyHawk Rivalry	L 64–85	3–3	Iowa Fieldhouse; Iowa City, Iowa
December 21, 1976*; 7:30 pm		at Vanderbilt	L 68–69	3–4	Memorial Gymnasium; Nashville, Tennessee
December 27, 1976*; 7:05 pm		vs. Missouri; Big Eight Holiday tournament quarterfinals	L 67–81	3–5	Kemper Arena; Kansas City, Missouri
December 29, 1976*; 1:05 pm		vs. Nebraska; Big Eight Holiday Tournament Consolation Semifinals	L 55–75	3–6	Kemper Arena; Kansas City, Missouri
December 30, 1976*; 1:05 pm		vs. Oklahoma State; Big Eight Holiday Tournament Seventh Place (forfeit by Oklahoma St)	L 50–56	4–6	Kemper Arena (3,500); Kansas City, Missouri
January 4, 1977*; 7:35 pm		at Drake; Iowa Big Four	L 55–61	4–7	Veterans Memorial Auditorium (8,512); Des Moines, Iowa
January 8, 1977; 8:35 pm		at Colorado	W 86–80	5–7 (1–0)	Balch Fieldhouse; Boulder, Colorado
January 12, 1977; 7:35 pm		at Kansas State	L 54–63	5–8 (1–1)	Ahearn Fieldhouse; Manhattan, Kansas
January 15, 1977; 12:10 pm, NBC		Nebraska	L 48–49	5–9 (1–2)	Hilton Coliseum; Ames, Iowa
January 18, 1977; 7:35 pm		at Kansas	L 62–73	5–10 (1–3)	Allen Fieldhouse; Lawrence, Kansas
January 22, 1977; 7:35 pm		Oklahoma State	W 62–56	6–10 (2–3)	Hilton Coliseum; Ames, Iowa
January 26, 1977; 7:35 pm		Oklahoma	L 52–62	6–11 (2–4)	Hilton Coliseum; Ames, Iowa
January 29, 1977; 7:35 pm		at Missouri	L 69–79	6–12 (2–5)	Hearnes Center; Columbia, Missouri
January 31, 1977*; 7:35 pm, WOI		Drake	W 82–61	7–12	Hilton Coliseum; Ames, Iowa
February 2, 1977; 7:35 pm		Kansas State	L 51–70	7–13 (2–6)	Hilton Coliseum; Ames, Iowa
February 5, 1977; 7:35 pm		at Nebraska	L 51–66	7–14 (2–7)	Devaney Sports Center; Lincoln, Nebraska
February 9, 1977; 7:35 pm		Colorado	L 62–64	7–15 (2–8)	Hilton Coliseum; Ames, Iowa
February 12, 1977; 7:35 pm		at Oklahoma State	L 79–89	7–16 (2–9)	Gallagher Hall; Stillwater, Oklahoma
February 16, 1977; 7:35 pm		Kansas	L 89–91 ^{OT}	7–17 (2–10)	Hilton Coliseum; Ames, Iowa
February 19, 1977; 4:00 pm		at Oklahoma	L 69–94	7–18 (2–11)	Lloyd Noble Center; Norman, Oklahoma
February 23, 1977; 7:35 pm		Missouri	W 95–86	8–18 (3–11)	Hilton Coliseum; Ames, Iowa
Big Eight tournament
February 26, 1977; 7:35 pm	(8)	at (1) Kansas State; Big Eight tournament quarterfinals	L 62–97	8–19	Ahearn Fieldhouse; Manhattan, Kansas
*Non-conference game. ^{#}Rankings from AP poll. (#) Tournament seedings in parentheses. All times are in Central Time.
