= Harmison =

Harmison is a surname. Notable people with the surname include:

- Ben Harmison (born 1986), Durham cricketer
- Chuck Harmison (born 1958), American basketball player
- Steve Harmison (born 1978), Durham and England cricketer

== See also ==
- Harrison (name)
