= 1977–78 Iowa State Cyclones men's basketball team =

American college basketball season

1977–78 Iowa State Cyclones men's basketball
- Conference: Big Eight Conference
- Record: 14–13 (9–5 Big Eight)
- Head coach: Lynn Nance (2nd season)
- Home arena: Hilton Coliseum

1977–78 Big Eight Conference men's basketball standings
| | Conf. | | | | Overall |
| Team | W | | L | PCT | W | | L | PCT |
|---|---|---|---|---|---|---|---|---|
| No. 10 Kansas | 13 | – | 1 | .929 | 24 | – | 5 | .828 |
| Iowa State | 9 | – | 5 | .643 | 14 | – | 13 | .519 |
| Nebraska | 9 | – | 5 | .643 | 22 | – | 8 | .733 |
| Kansas State | 7 | – | 7 | .500 | 18 | – | 11 | .621 |
| Oklahoma | 7 | – | 7 | .500 | 14 | – | 13 | .519 |
| Oklahoma State | 4 | – | 10 | .286 | 10 | – | 16 | .385 |
| Missouri † | 4 | – | 10 | .286 | 14 | – | 16 | .467 |
| Colorado | 3 | – | 11 | .214 | 9 | – | 18 | .333 |
† 1978 Big Eight tournament winner Rankings from AP Poll

The 1977–78 Iowa State Cyclones men's basketball team represented Iowa State University during the 1977–78 NCAA Division I men's basketball season. The Cyclones were coached by Lynn Nance, who was in his second season with the Cyclones. They played their home games at Hilton Coliseum in Ames, Iowa.

They finished the season 14–13, 9–5 in Big Eight play to finish tied for second place. The Cyclones lost in the first round of the Big Eight tournament to seventh seeded Missouri, falling 65–63.

== Roster ==
1977–78 Iowa State Cyclones men's basketball team
Players
Coaches

| Pos. | # | Name | Height | Weight | Year | Hometown |
|---|---|---|---|---|---|---|
| G | 12 | Leonard Allen | 6 ft 4 in (1.93 m) | 195 lb (88 kg) | Sr | Flint, Michigan |
| F | 42 | Steve Burgason (C) | 6 ft 6 in (1.98 m) | 205 lb (93 kg) | Sr | Ames, Iowa |
| F | 32 | Ricky Byrdsong (C) | 6 ft 6 in (1.98 m) | 191 lb (87 kg) | Sr | Atlanta, GA |
| G | 15 | Carlton Evans | 6 ft 1 in (1.85 m) | 175 lb (79 kg) | Jr | Macon, GA |
| F | 44 | Bob Fowler | 6 ft 4 in (1.93 m) | 197 lb (89 kg) | So | Westland, Michigan |
| G | 14 | Joe Gideon | 6 ft 3 in (1.91 m) | 178 lb (81 kg) | Fr | Forsyth, Missouri |
| C | 54 | Ivan Gruhl | 6 ft 9 in (2.06 m) | 210 lb (95 kg) | Fr | Everett, WA |
| C | 50 | Chuck Harmison | 6 ft 9 in (2.06 m) | 210 lb (95 kg) | So | Ames, Iowa |
| G | 10 | Charles Harris | 6 ft 2 in (1.88 m) | 175 lb (79 kg) | Fr | Macon, GA |
| F | 40 | Paul Landsberger | 6 ft 6 in (1.98 m) | 204 lb (93 kg) | Sr | St. Paul, Minnesota |
| G | 22 | Jamie Lilly | 6 ft 4 in (1.93 m) | 173 lb (78 kg) | Fr | Humboldt, Iowa |
| G | 25 | Jon Ness | 6 ft 2 in (1.88 m) | 175 lb (79 kg) | Fr | Story City, Iowa |
| F | 24 | Andrew Parker | 6 ft 5 in (1.96 m) | 196 lb (89 kg) | Jr | Fort Lauderdale, Florida |
| G | 30 | John Tillo | 6 ft 4 in (1.93 m) | 200 lb (91 kg) | So | Sioux City, Iowa |
| C | 52 | Dean Uthoff | 6 ft 11 in (2.11 m) | 247 lb (112 kg) | So | Cedar Rapids, Iowa |
| F | 33 | Mark West | 6 ft 8 in (2.03 m) | 196 lb (89 kg) | Fr | Altoona, Iowa |

Head coach

- Lynn Nance

Assistant coach(es)

Legend

- (C) Team captain
- (S) Suspended
- (I) Ineligible
- (W) Walk-on
- Injured
- Current redshirt

== Schedule and results ==
| Date time, TV | Rank^{#} | Opponent^{#} | Result | Record | Site city, state |
Exhibition
| November 17, 1977*; 7:35 pm | | Cuban National Team; Exhibition | W 61–47 | | Hilton Coliseum (4,000); Ames, Iowa |
Regular season
| November 26, 1977*; 7:35 pm | | Iowa; CyHawk Rivalry | W 79–78 | 1–0 | Hilton Coliseum (14,308); Ames, Iowa |
| December 2, 1977*; 10:05 pm | | at Arizona State; Sun Devil Classic Semifinals | L 69–87 | 1–1 | ASU Activity Center; Tempe, Arizona |
| December 3, 1977*; 8:05 pm | | vs. Tennessee; Sun Devil Classic Consolation | L 76–81 | 1–2 | ASU Activity Center; Tempe, Arizona |
| December 7, 1977*; 7:35 pm | | Nebraska-Omaha | W 86–78 | 2–2 | Hilton Coliseum; Ames, Iowa |
| December 10, 1977*; 7:35 pm | | at Drake; Iowa Big Four | L 77–91 | 2–3 | Veterans Memorial Auditorium (10,638); Des Moines, Iowa |
| December 12, 1977*; 7:35 pm | | Wisconsin | W 82–73 | 3–3 | Hilton Coliseum; Ames, Iowa |
| December 17, 1977*; 10:05 pm | | at California | L 73–102 | 3–4 | Harmon Gymnasium; Berkeley, California |
| December 20, 1977*; 10:05 pm | | at San Jose State | L 56–59 | 3–5 | Independence Fieldhouse; San Jose, California |
| December 28, 1977*; 7:00 pm | | vs. Oklahoma; Big Eight Holiday tournament quarterfinals | L 69–74 ^{OT} | 3–6 | Kemper Arena (10,400); Kansas City, Missouri |
| December 29, 1977*; 3:05 pm | | vs. Missouri; Big Eight Holiday Tournament Consolation Semifinals | L 62–66 | 3–7 | Kemper Arena (7,252); Kansas City, Missouri |
| December 30, 1977*; 1:05 pm | | vs. Colorado; Big Eight Holiday Tournament Seventh Place | W 83–79 | 4–7 | Kemper Arena; Kansas City, Missouri |
| January 5, 1978*; 7:35 pm, WOI | | Drake; Iowa Big Four | W 74–71 | 5–7 | Hilton Coliseum; Ames, Iowa |
| January 8, 1978; 1:10 pm, TVS–NBC | | Colorado | W 84–64 | 6–7 (1–0) | Hilton Coliseum; Ames, Iowa |
| January 11, 1978; 7:35 pm | | Kansas State | W 82–77 | 7–7 (2–0) | Hilton Coliseum; Ames, Iowa |
| January 14, 1978; 7:35 pm | | at Nebraska | W 65–59 | 8–7 (3–0) | Devaney Sports Center; Lincoln, Nebraska |
| January 18, 1978; 7:35 pm | | No. 8 Kansas | L 82–100 | 8–8 (3–1) | Hilton Coliseum; Ames, Iowa |
| January 21, 1978; 7:35 pm | | at Oklahoma State | W 59–53 | 9–8 (4–1) | Gallagher Hall; Stillwater, Oklahoma |
| January 25, 1978; 7:35 pm | | at Oklahoma | W 76–74 ^{OT} | 10–8 (5–1) | Lloyd Noble Center; Norman, Oklahoma |
| January 28, 1978; 7:35 pm | | Missouri | W 68–59 | 11–8 (6–1) | Hilton Coliseum; Ames, Iowa |
| February 1, 1978; 7:35 pm | | at Kansas State | L 63–74 | 11–9 (6–2) | Ahearn Fieldhouse; Manhattan, Kansas |
| February 4, 1978; 7:35 pm | | Nebraska | L 56–62 | 11–10 (6–3) | Hilton Coliseum; Ames, Iowa |
| February 8, 1978; 8:35 pm | | at Colorado | L 64–70 | 11–11 (6–4) | Balch Fieldhouse; Boulder, Colorado |
| February 11, 1978; 7:35 pm | | Oklahoma State | W 93–69 | 12–11 (7–4) | Hilton Coliseum; Ames, Iowa |
| February 15, 1978; 7:35 pm | | at No. 6 Kansas | L 70–80 | 12–12 (7–5) | Allen Fieldhouse; Lawrence, Kansas |
| February 18, 1978; 7:35 pm | | Oklahoma | W 77–71 | 13–12 (8–5) | Hilton Coliseum; Ames, Iowa |
| February 25, 1978; 7:35 pm | | at Missouri | W 67–63 | 14–12 (9–5) | Hearnes Center; Columbia, Missouri |
Big Eight tournament
| February 28, 1978; 7:35 pm | (2) | at (7) Missouri; Big Eight tournament quarterfinals | L 63–65 | 14–13 | Hilton Coliseum; Ames, Iowa |
*Non-conference game. ^{#}Rankings from AP poll. (#) Tournament seedings in parentheses. All times are in Central Time.
