= 1979 Big Eight Conference men's basketball tournament =

- Classification: Division I
- Season: 1978–79
- Teams: 8
- First round site: Campus Sites; Campus Arenas
- Finals site: Kemper Arena; Kansas City, MO
- Champions: Oklahoma (1st title)
- Winning coach: Dave Bliss (1st title)
- MVP: Al Beal (Oklahoma)

1978–79 Big Eight Conference men's basketball standings
	Conf.				Overall
Team	W		L	PCT	W		L	PCT
No. 16 Oklahoma †	10	–	4	.714	21	–	10	.677
Missouri	8	–	6	.571	13	–	15	.464
Kansas State	8	–	6	.571	16	–	12	.571
Kansas	8	–	6	.571	18	–	11	.621
Nebraska	7	–	7	.500	14	–	13	.519
Iowa State	6	–	8	.429	11	–	16	.407
Oklahoma State	5	–	9	.357	12	–	15	.444
Colorado	4	–	10	.286	14	–	13	.519
† 1979 Big Eight tournament winner Rankings from AP Poll

The 1979 Big Eight Conference men's basketball tournament was held February 27–March 3 at a combination of on-campus gymnasiums and Kemper Arena in Kansas City, Missouri.

Top-seeded Oklahoma defeated Kansas in the championship game, 80–65, to capture their first Big Eight men's basketball tournament.

The Sooners, in turn, received a bid to the 1979 NCAA tournament. No other Big 8 members were invited to the tournament.

== Format ==
All eight of the conference's members participated in the tournament field. They were seeded based on regular season conference records, with all teams beginning play in the initial quarterfinal round.

All first-round games were played on the home court of the higher-seeded team. The semifinals and championship game, in turn, were played at a neutral site at Kemper Arena in Kansas City, Missouri.

== Bracket ==
Quarterfinals; Tuesday, February 27
1	Oklahoma	77
8	Colorado	57
5	Nebraska	60
4	Kansas State	61**
3	Kansas	91
6	Iowa State	70
7	Oklahoma State	70
2	Missouri	92

Semifinals; Friday, March 2
1	Oklahoma	72
4	Kansas State	68
3	Kansas	76
2	Missouri	73

Championship; Saturday, March 3
1	Oklahoma	80
3	Kansas	65
