= 1977 Southwest Conference men's basketball tournament =

Collegiate basketball tournament

- Classification: Division I
- Season: 1976–77
- Teams: 9
- Site: The Summit; Houston, Texas
- Champions: Arkansas (1st title)
- Winning coach: Eddie Sutton (1st title)
- MVP: Ron Brewer (Arkansas)

1976–77 Southwest Conference men's basketball standings
	Conf.				Overall
Team	W		L	PCT	W		L	PCT
No. 18 Arkansas†	16	–	0	1.000	26	–	2	.929
Houston	13	–	3	.813	29	–	8	.784
Texas Tech	12	–	4	.750	20	–	9	.690
Texas	8	–	8	.500	13	–	13	.500
Texas A&M	8	–	8	.500	14	–	14	.500
SMU	7	–	9	.438	8	–	19	.296
Baylor	5	–	11	.313	11	–	17	.393
Rice	3	–	13	.188	9	–	18	.333
TCU	0	–	16	.000	3	–	23	.115
† 1977 SWC tournament winner Rankings from AP Poll

The 1977 Southwest Conference men's basketball tournament was held March 3–5, 1977, at The Summit in Houston, Texas. The first round took place February 26 at the higher seeded campus sites.

Number 1 seed Arkansas defeated 2 seed Houston 84–70 to win their 1st championship and receive the conference's automatic bid to the 1977 NCAA tournament.

== Format and Seeding ==
The tournament consisted of 9 teams, seeds 2-8 played in an 8 team single-elimination tournament with the winner playing the top seeded team in the tournament final.

Place	Seed	Team	Conference			Overall		
Place	Seed	Team	W	L	%	W	L	%
1	1	Arkansas	16	0	1.000	26	2	.929
2	2	Houston	13	3	.813	29	8	.784
3	3	Texas Tech	12	4	.750	20	9	.690
4	4	Texas	8	8	.500	13	13	.500
4	5	Texas A&M	8	8	.500	14	14	.500
6	6	SMU	7	9	.438	8	19	.296
7	7	Baylor	5	11	.313	11	17	.393
8	8	Rice	3	13	.188	9	18	.333
9	9	TCU	0	16	.000	3	23	.115

== Tournament ==
First round Saturday, February 26
2	Houston	111
9	TCU	67
5	Texas A&M	89
6	SMU	79
4	Texas	70
7	Baylor	72
3	Texas Tech	93
8	Rice	74

Quarterfinals; Thursday, March 3
2	Houston	96
5	Texas A&M	77
7	Baylor	57
3	Texas Tech	66

Semifinals; Friday, March 4
2	Houston	94
3	Texas Tech	83

=== Final ===
Finals; Saturday, March 5
1	#7 Arkansas	84
2	Houston	70
