= 1978–79 Oklahoma Sooners men's basketball team =

American college basketball season

1978–79 Oklahoma Sooners men's basketball
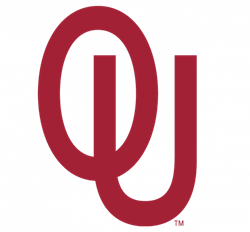

Big 8 Conference Regular Season Champions Big 8 Conference Tournament Champions

NCAA Division I Tournament, Sweet Sixteen
- Conference: Big 8 Conference

Ranking
- AP: No. 16
- Record: 21–10 (10–4 Big 8)
- Head coach: Dave Bliss (4th season)
- Assistant coaches: Les Fertig; John Underwood
- Home arena: Lloyd Noble Center (Capacity: 11,528)

1978–79 Big Eight Conference men's basketball standings
| | Conf. | | | | Overall |
| Team | W | | L | PCT | W | | L | PCT |
|---|---|---|---|---|---|---|---|---|
| No. 16 Oklahoma † | 10 | – | 4 | .714 | 21 | – | 10 | .677 |
| Missouri | 8 | – | 6 | .571 | 13 | – | 15 | .464 |
| Kansas State | 8 | – | 6 | .571 | 16 | – | 12 | .571 |
| Kansas | 8 | – | 6 | .571 | 18 | – | 11 | .621 |
| Nebraska | 7 | – | 7 | .500 | 14 | – | 13 | .519 |
| Iowa State | 6 | – | 8 | .429 | 11 | – | 16 | .407 |
| Oklahoma State | 5 | – | 9 | .357 | 12 | – | 15 | .444 |
| Colorado | 4 | – | 10 | .286 | 14 | – | 13 | .519 |
† 1979 Big Eight tournament winner Rankings from AP Poll

The 1978–79 Oklahoma Sooners men's basketball team represented the University of Oklahoma in competitive college basketball during the 1978–79 NCAA Division I season. The Oklahoma Sooners men's basketball team played its home games in the Lloyd Noble Center and was a member of the National Collegiate Athletic Association's (NCAA) former Big Eight Conference at that time. The team posted a 21–10 overall record and a 10–4 conference record to finish first in the Conference for head coach Dave Bliss. This was the only Big Eight Conference Regular Season Championship for Bliss.

The team was led by Big Eight Conference Men's Basketball Player of the Year John McCullough. Despite losing two of three games in the Big Eight Conference Pre-Season Tournament, the team posted a 10–4 record during the conference regular season and won all three of its games during the Big Eight Conference Post-Season Tournament. Because of the conference tournaments, the team played both Kansas and Kansas State four times. It swept the season series with Kansas State and split the season series with Kansas. The team also played Nebraska three times, only winning the home game. The team reached the sweet sixteen round of the 1979 NCAA Division I basketball tournament by beating Texas before losing to Indiana State.

The Sooners' appearance in the 1979 NCAA Tournament marked their first participation in the event since 1947.

== Schedule ==
| Date time, TV | Rank^{#} | Opponent^{#} | Result | Record | Site city, state |
Regular season
| November 25, 1978* | | Oklahoma City | L 75–81 | 0–1 | Lloyd Noble Center; Norman, OK |
| November 28, 1978* | | at Baylor | W 78–75 | 1–1 | Heart O' Texas Coliseum; Waco, TX |
| December 2, 1978* | | at Arkansas | L 74–80 | 1–2 | Barnhill Arena; Fayetteville, AR |
| December 5, 1978* | | No. 13 Texas | W 71–65 | 2–2 | Lloyd Noble Center; Norman, OK |
| December 9, 1978* | | Louisiana Tech | W 84–68 | 3–2 | Lloyd Noble Center; Norman, OK |
| December 12, 1978* | | Pepperdine | W 92–66 | 4–2 | Lloyd Noble Center; Norman, OK |
| December 15, 1978* | | vs. Auburn; Big Sun Classic | L 70–78 | 4–3 | Bayfront Center; St. Petersburg, FL |
| December 16, 1978* | | vs. South Florida; Big Sun Classic | W 86–73 | 5–3 | Bayfront Center; St. Petersburg, FL |
| December 19, 1978* | | Cal State Bakersfield | W 100–75 | 6–3 | Lloyd Noble Center; Norman, OK |
| December 27, 1978* | | vs. Kansas State; Big Eight Holiday Tournament | W 62–61 | 7–3 | Kemper Arena; Kansas City, MO |
| December 29, 1978* | | vs. No. 18 Kansas; Big Eight Holiday Tournament | L 75–86 | 7–4 | Kemper Arena; Kansas City, MO |
| December 30, 1978* | | vs. Nebraska; Big Eight Holiday Tournament | L 53–69 | 7–5 | Kemper Arena; Kansas City, MO |
| January 10, 1979 | | No. 15 Kansas | W 68–45 | 8–5 (1–0) | Lloyd Noble Center; Norman, OK |
| January 13, 1979 | | at Missouri | L 67–73 | 8–6 (1–1) | Hearnes Center; Columbia, MO |
| January 17, 1979 | | Oklahoma State; Bedlam Series | W 64–59 | 9–6 (2–1) | Lloyd Noble Center; Norman, OK |
| January 20, 1979 | | Colorado | W 72–64 | 10–6 (3–1) | Lloyd Noble Center; Norman, OK |
| January 24, 1979 | | at Nebraska | L 56–74 | 10–7 (3–2) | Bob Devaney Sports Center; Lincoln, NE |
| January 27, 1979 | | Iowa State | W 98–83 | 11–7 (4–2) | Lloyd Noble Center; Norman, OK |
| January 31, 1979 | | at Kansas State | W 70–62 | 12–7 (5–2) | Ahearn Field House; Manhattan, KS |
| February 3, 1979 | | Missouri | W 80–76 | 13–7 (6–2) | Lloyd Noble Center; Norman, OK |
| February 7, 1979 | | at Oklahoma State; Bedlam Series | W 74–67 | 14–7 (7–2) | Gallagher Hall; Stillwater, OK |
| February 10, 1979 | | at Kansas | L 62–74 | 14–8 (7–3) | Allen Fieldhouse; Lawrence, KS |
| February 14, 1979 | | Nebraska | W 79–58 | 15–8 (8–3) | Lloyd Noble Center; Norman, OK |
| February 17, 1979 | | at Colorado | W 67–62 | 16–8 (9–3) | Balch Fieldhouse; Boulder, CO |
| February 21, 1979 | | at Iowa State | L 65–66 | 16–9 (9–4) | Hilton Coliseum; Ames, IA |
| February 24, 1979 | | Kansas State | W 65–52 | 17–9 (10–4) | Lloyd Noble Center; Norman, OK |
Big Eight tournament
| February 27, 1979 | (1) | (8) Colorado; First Round | W 77–57 | 18–9 | Lloyd Noble Center; Norman, OK |
| March 2, 1979 | (1) | vs. (4) Kansas State; Semifinal | W 72–68 | 19–9 | Kemper Arena; Kansas City, MO |
| March 3, 1979 | (1) | vs. (3) Kansas; Championship | W 80–65 | 20–9 | Kemper Arena; Kansas City, MO |
NCAA tournament
| March 11, 1979* | (5 MW) | vs. (4 MW) No. 15 Texas; Second Round | W 90–76 | 21–9 | Moody Coliseum; Dallas, TX |
| March 15, 1979* | (5 MW) | vs. (1 MW) No. 1 Indiana State; Sweet Sixteen | L 72–93 | 21–10 | Riverfront Coliseum; Cincinnati, OH |
*Non-conference game. ^{#}Rankings from AP Poll. (#) Tournament seedings in parentheses. All times are in Central Time. (#) during NCAA Tournament is seed within region MW=Midwest.

== Honors ==
- Big Eight POY: John McCullough

== Team players drafted into the NBA ==
The following players were drafted in the 1979 NBA draft:

| Round | Pick | Player | Position | NBA club |
|---|---|---|---|---|
| 4 | 85 | John McCullough | Guard | Kansas City Kings |

The following letter winners from this team were drafted in the NBA draft in subsequent years (all in the 1980 NBA draft): Terry Stotts (2nd, 38th, Houston Rockets), Al Beal (3rd, 63rd Milwaukee Bucks), and Aaron Curry (5th, 98th, New Jersey Nets).

== See also ==
- Oklahoma Sooners men's basketball
- List of Oklahoma Sooners Men's Basketball Conference Championships
- 1979 NCAA Division I basketball tournament
