= 1976–77 Missouri Tigers men's basketball team =

American college basketball season

1976–77 Missouri Tigers men's basketball
- Conference: Big Eight Conference
- Record: 21–8 (9–5 Big 8)
- Head coach: Norm Stewart (10th season)
- Assistant coaches: Gene Jones (3rd season); George Scholz (1st season)
- Captain: Bill Flamank
- Home arena: Hearnes Center

1976–77 Big Eight Conference men's basketball standings
	Conf.				Overall
Team	W		L	PCT	W		L	PCT
No. 16 Kansas State †	11	–	3	.786	23	–	8	.742
Missouri	9	–	5	.643	21	–	8	.724
Oklahoma	9	–	5	.643	18	–	10	.643
Kansas	8	–	6	.571	18	–	10	.643
Nebraska	7	–	7	.500	15	–	14	.517
Colorado	5	–	9	.357	11	–	16	.407
Oklahoma State	4	–	10	.286	10	–	17	.370
Iowa State	3	–	11	.214	7	–	20	.259
† 1977 Big Eight tournament winner Rankings from AP Poll

The 1976–77 Missouri Tigers men's basketball team represented the University of Missouri during the 1976–77 NCAA men's basketball season.

== Roster ==
Name	#	Position	Year
Scott Sims	20	Guard	Senior
Chuck Simms	23	Forward	
Jeff Curie	24	Guard	Junior
Jim Kennedy	35	Forward	Senior
Kim Anderson	42	Forward	Senior
Danny Van Rheen	44	Forward	
James Clabon	45	Center	
Brad Droy	54	Forward	Freshman
Stan Ray	55	Center	
Larry Drew		Guard	Freshman

== Schedule ==
Date time, TV	Rank^{#}	Opponent^{#}	Result	Record	High points	High rebounds	High assists	Site (attendance) city, state
November 26, 1976*	No. 20	vs. SIU–Carbondale	L 55–68	0–1	–	–	–	
November 30, 1976*		South Dakota	W 85–76	1–1	–	–	–	Hearnes Center; Columbia, MO
December 3, 1976*		Illinois; Show–Me Classic	W 76–75	2–1	–	–	–	
December 4, 1976*		North Texas State; Show–Me Classic	W 97–84	3–1	–	–	–	
December 7, 1976*		at Toledo	L 59–63	3–2	–	–	–	
December 11, 1976*		Florida State	W 65–63	4–2	–	–	–	Hearnes Center; Columbia, MO
December 17, 1976*		vs. USC; Sun Carnival	W 87–77	5–2	–	–	–	
December 18, 1976*		vs. UTEP; Sun Carnival	W 83–60	6–2	–	–	–	
December 27, 1976		vs. Iowa State; Big Eight tournament	W 81–67	7–2	–	–	–	Kansas City, MO
December 29, 1976		vs. Colorado; Big Eight tournament	W 86–77	8–2	–	–	–	Kansas City, MO
December 30, 1976*		vs. Kansas; Big Eight tournament	W 69–65	9–2	–	–	–	Kansas City, MO
January 8, 1977		at Kansas	L 72–77	9–3 (0–1)	–	–	–	Lawrence, KS
January 10, 1977*		San Diego State	W 84–69	10–3	–	–	–	Hearnes Center; Columbia, MO
January 12		Oklahoma	W 69–60	11–3 (1–1)	–	–	–	Hearnes Center; Columbia, MO
January 15, 1977		at Oklahoma State	W 73–68	12–3 (2–1)	–	–	–	Stillwater, OK
January 19, 1977		at Colorado	W 90–83	13–3 (3–1)	–	–	–	Boulder, CO
January 22, 1977		Nebraska	W 76–63	14–3 (4–1)	–	–	–	Hearnes Center; Columbia, MO
January 26, 1977		at Kansas State	W 66–60	15–3 (5–1)	–	–	–	Manhattan, KS
January 29, 1977		Iowa State	W 79–69	16–3 (6–1)	–	–	–	Hearnes Center; Columbia, MO
February 2, 1977		at Oklahoma	L 63–66	16–4 (6–2)	–	–	–	Norman, OK
February 5, 1977		Oklahoma State	W 97–75	17–4 (7–2)	–	–	–	Hearnes Center; Columbia, MO
February 9, 1977		Kansas	W 87–79	18–4 (8–2)	–	–	–	Hearnes Center; Columbia, MO
February 12, 1977		at Nebraska	L 58–60	18–5 (8–3)	–	–	–	Lincoln, NE
February 16, 1977		Colorado	W 101–74	19–5 (9–3)	–	–	–	Hearnes Center; Columbia, MO
February 19, 1977		Kansas State	L 77–88	19–6 (9–4)	–	–	–	Hearnes Center; Columbia, MO
February 23, 1977		at Iowa State	L 86–95	19–7 (9–5)	–	–	–	Ames, IA
February 26, 1977*		vs. Oklahoma State; Big Eight Postseason tournament	W 92–74	20–7	–	–	–	
March 3, 1977*		vs. Oklahoma; Big Eight Postseason Tournament	W 90–75	21–7	–	–	–	
March 4, 1977*		vs. Kansas State; Big Eight Postseason Tournament	L 67–72 ^{OT}	21–8	–	–	–	
*Non-conference game. ^{#}Rankings from AP Poll. (#) Tournament seedings in parentheses.
