= 1977–78 Kansas Jayhawks men's basketball team =

American college basketball season

1977–78 Kansas Jayhawks men's basketball

Big Eight Champions

NCAA tournament, First Round
- Conference: Big Eight Conference

Ranking
- Coaches: No. 8
- AP: No. 10
- Record: 24–5 (13–1 Big 8)
- Head coach: Ted Owens (14th season)
- Assistant coach: Walt Wesley (1st season)
- Captains: John Douglas; Ken Koenigs
- Home arena: Allen Fieldhouse

1977–78 Big Eight Conference men's basketball standings
	Conf.				Overall
Team	W		L	PCT	W		L	PCT
No. 10 Kansas	13	–	1	.929	24	–	5	.828
Iowa State	9	–	5	.643	14	–	13	.519
Nebraska	9	–	5	.643	22	–	8	.733
Kansas State	7	–	7	.500	18	–	11	.621
Oklahoma	7	–	7	.500	14	–	13	.519
Oklahoma State	4	–	10	.286	10	–	16	.385
Missouri †	4	–	10	.286	14	–	16	.467
Colorado	3	–	11	.214	9	–	18	.333
† 1978 Big Eight tournament winner Rankings from AP Poll

The 1977–78 Kansas Jayhawks men's basketball team represented the University of Kansas during the 1977–78 NCAA Division I men's basketball season.

== Roster ==
- Darnell Valentine
- John Douglas
- Ken Koenigs
- Donnie Von Moore
- Paul Mokeski
- Clint Johnson
- Wilmore Fowler
- Brad Sanders
- Scott Anderson
- Hasan Houston
- Douglas Booty Neal
- Mac Stallcup
- Milt Gibson
- John Crawford
- David Verser

== Schedule ==
Date time, TV	Rank^{#}	Opponent^{#}	Result	Record	Site city, state
November 28*		Central Michigan	W 121-65	1-0	Allen Fieldhouse; Lawrence, KS
November 30*		Fordham	W 99-67	2-0	Allen Fieldhouse; Lawrence, KS
December 2*		SMU	W 107-71	3-0	Allen Fieldhouse; Lawrence, KS
December 5*		Murray State	W 106-71	4-0	Allen Fieldhouse; Lawrence, KS
December 7*	No. 19	Fairleigh Dickinson	W 88-54	5-0	Allen Fieldhouse; Lawrence, KS
December 10*	No. 19	No. 1 Kentucky	L 66-73	5-1	Allen Fieldhouse; Lawrence, KS
December 17*	No. 20	Saint Louis	W 85-65	6-1	Allen Fieldhouse; Lawrence, KS
December 20*	No. 16	at Oral Roberts	W 91-73	7-1	Mabee Center; Tulsa, OK
December 22*	No. 16	vs. No. 4 Arkansas	L 72-78	7-2	Barton Coliseum; Little Rock, AR
December 28	No. 17	vs. Missouri; Border War	W 96-49	8-2	Kemper Arena; Kansas City, MO
December 29	No. 17	vs. Oklahoma	W 79-76	9-2	Kemper Arena; Kansas City, MO
December 30	No. 17	vs. Kansas State; Sunflower Showdown	W 67-62	10-2	Kemper Arena; Kansas City, MO
January 7	No. 14	at Missouri; Border War	W 71-67	11-2 (1-0)	Hearnes Center; Columbia, MO
January 11	No. 10	at Oklahoma State	W 69-57	12-2 (2-0)	Gallagher-Iba Arena; Stillwater, OK
January 14	No. 10	Oklahoma	W 91-61	13-2 (3-0)	Allen Fieldhouse; Lawrence, KS
January 18	No. 8	at Iowa State	W 100-82	14-2 (4-0)	James H. Hilton Coliseum; Ames, IA
January 21	No. 8	Kansas State; Sunflower Showdown	W 56-52	15-2 (5-0)	Allen Fieldhouse; Lawrence, KS
January 25	No. 8	at Nebraska	L 58-62	15-3 (5-1)	Bob Devaney Sports Center; Lincoln, NE
January 28	No. 8	Colorado	W 85-56	16-3 (6-1)	Allen Fieldhouse; Lawrence, KS
February 1	No. 8	Oklahoma State	W 83-65	17-3 (7-1)	Allen Fieldhouse; Lawrence, KS
February 4	No. 8	at Oklahoma	W 69-68	18-3 (8-1)	Lloyd Noble Center; Norman, OK
February 8	No. 8	Missouri; Border War	W 72-52	19-3 (9-1)	Allen Fieldhouse; Lawrence, KS
February 11	No. 8	at Kansas State; Sunflower Showdown	W 75-63	20-3 (10-1)	Ahearn Field House; Manhattan, KS
February 15	No. 6	Iowa State	W 80-70	21-3 (11-1)	Allen Fieldhouse; Lawrence, KS
February 18	No. 6	Nebraska	W 75-70	22-3 (12-1)	Allen Fieldhouse; Lawrence, KS
February 25	No. 6	at Colorado	W 70-60	23-3 (13-1)	Balch Fieldhouse; Boulder, CO
February 28		No. 5 Colorado; Big Eight Conference men's basketball tournament Quarterfinals	W 82-66	24-3	Allen Fieldhouse; Lawrence, KS
March 3	No. 5	vs. Kansas State; Big Eight Conference men's basketball tournament semifinals Sunflower Showdown	L 76-87	24-4	Kemper Arena; Kansas City, MO
March 11	No. 9	vs. No. 2 UCLA; NCAA West Regional Quarterfinals	L 76-83	24-5	McArthur Court; Eugene, OR
*Non-conference game. ^{#}Rankings from AP Poll. (#) Tournament seedings in parentheses. West=W.
