= Norm Stewart =

American basketball coach and player (born 1935)

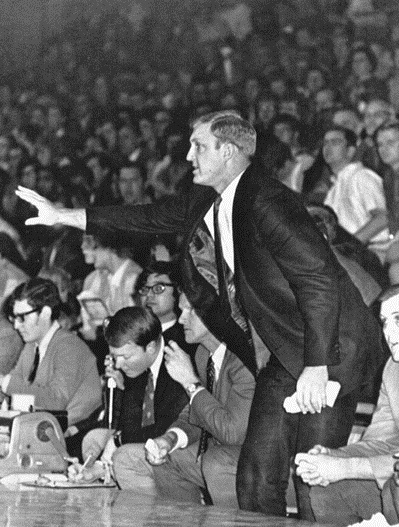
- Stewart from The Savitar, 1969

Biographical details
- Born: January 20, 1935 (age 91); Shelbyville, Missouri, U.S.

Playing career

Basketball
- 1953–1956: Missouri
- 1956–1957: St. Louis Hawks

Baseball
- 1954–1956: Missouri
- 1957: Aberdeen Pheasants
- Positions: Forward (basketball); Pitcher (baseball)

Coaching career (HC unless noted)

Basketball
- 1957–1961: Missouri (assistant)
- 1961–1967: State College of Iowa
- 1967–1999: Missouri

Baseball
- 1957–1961: Missouri (assistant)

Head coaching record
- Overall: 731–375 (.661)
- Tournaments: 12–16 (.429) (NCAA Division I); 4–3 (.571) (NCAA Division II); 1–5 (.167) (NIT); 0–1 (.000) (NCIT)

Accomplishments and honors

Championships
- As player: College World Series (1954); As head coach: 2 NCC regular season (1962, 1964); 8 Big Eight regular season (1976, 1980–1983, 1987, 1990, 1994); 6 Big Eight tournament (1978, 1982, 1987, 1989, 1991, 1993)

Awards
- 2x UPI Coach of the Year (1982, 1994); AP College Coach of the Year (1994); Sporting News Coach of the Year (1994); 6x Big Eight Coach of the Year (1972, 1976, 1982, 1983, 1987, 1994)
- College Basketball Hall of Fame; Inducted in 2007

Norman Eugene Stewart (born January 20, 1935) is an American retired college basketball coach and player and a former minor league baseball player. He coached at the University of Northern Iowa (then known as State College of Iowa) from 1961 to 1967, but is best known for his career with the University of Missouri from 1967 until 1999. He retired with an overall coaching record of 731–375 in 38 seasons. The court at Mizzou Arena (and previously at the Hearnes Center) is named in his honor.

== Early life ==
Stewart was born in Shelby County, Missouri. He grew up the son of a gas station owner around the small farming community of Shelbyville, and graduated from high school there in 1952. After high school Stewart enrolled at the University of Missouri, becoming a standout in both basketball and baseball for the Tigers. Stewart was a two-time team captain, and all-Big Seven selection in basketball. His 24.1 scoring average per-game in 1956 ranks fourth in school history and earned him a spot on the 1956 Helms Foundation All-American team. It was while at MU he met the love of his life, Virginia (Zimmerley) Stewart. Following graduation from Mizzou, Stewart was drafted by the St. Louis Hawks in the 1956 NBA draft, playing one season at forward. He also signed a contract with Major League Baseball's Baltimore Orioles, pitching in 1957 for the Class C Aberdeen Pheasants, but never played at the big-league level.

== Coaching career ==
Following his brief career as a professional athlete, Norm Stewart returned to the University of Missouri in 1957 to earn his master's degree. He also served as an assistant basketball coach under Sparky Stalcup and an assistant baseball coach under Hi Simmons. In 1961 Stewart became head basketball coach at the State College Of Iowa (now University of Northern Iowa). In six seasons Stewart's Panthers compiled a record of 97 wins, 42 losses, and two conference championships.

On March 10, 1967, Stewart was named head basketball coach at his alma mater. He inherited a program that had only garnered two winning seasons since 1956, his senior year. The Tigers had only finished as high as fourth in the Big Six/Seven/Eight three times since then. He didn't take long to turn the program around. In his fifth year, he led the Tigers to the National Invitation Tournament, their first postseason appearance of any sort since the 1944 NCAA basketball tournament, and only the second in school history. Four years later, the Tigers won their second outright conference title in school history and went to the NCAA tournament for only the second time ever, advancing all the way to the Elite Eight. He reached his peak from 1979 to 1983, when the Tigers won four straight Big Eight regular season titles.

In 32 seasons as Missouri head coach, Stewart had a 634–333 overall record, making him far and away the winningest coach in school history. Stewart's Missouri teams also won eight Big Eight regular-season championships, six Big Eight tournament titles, made 16 NCAA Tournament appearances (including Elite Eight appearances in 1976 and 1994; though the 1994 run was vacated), five NIT appearances, and one National Commissioners Invitational Tournament appearance. Stewart also was UPI Coach of the Year (1982) and Associated Press Coach of the Year (1994).

=== NCAA penalties and probation ===
In 1990, the NCAA placed Missouri's basketball program on probation for two years and banned the team from that season's post-season tournaments for major violations of rules regarding recruiting, benefits for athletes and irregularities in academics that occurred under Stewart from 1985 through 1989. The NCAA also imposed limits on the Tigers' recruiting practices and the number of scholarships that could be offered in the 1991–92 and 1992–93 academic years. Two of Stewart's assistant coaches, Rich Daly and Bob Sundvold, were forced to resign over the scandal, but Stewart was able to remain as Missouri's coach. Stewart's legal attorney was future Missouri interim president Steve Owens.

Shortly after the 1994 Elite Eight season, Missouri discovered that senior center Jevon Crudup had accepted thousands of dollars in inducements from a middleman working for agents hoping to sign Crudup if he was selected in the 1994 NBA draft. Missouri didn't dispute that Crudup had received the payments, but contended that it didn't know about them. In 1996, the NCAA largely exonerated Stewart and the Tigers, but forced them to vacate their 1994 NCAA Tournament appearance.

== Health issues and retirement ==
In 1989, Stewart was diagnosed with colon cancer, missing the final 14 games of the 1988–89 season. He underwent invasive surgery and chemotherapy and was able to return to coaching the following season. Stewart's assistant, Rich Daly, took over as interim coach for the rest of the season, but Missouri credits the entire season to Stewart.

The 1990s were a time of both highs and lows for Mizzou basketball, with the highlight being 1994 when the Tigers went a perfect 14–0 in conference play. For that special season, Norm Stewart was named College Coach of the Year by the Associated Press and five other leading organizations. Following another winning 1998–99 season, the Stewart Era came to an end as he announced his retirement on April 1, 1999. As a measure of the growth in the Tigers' stature under his watch, he won four more games in 32 years than the Tigers had previously won in their first 60 years of play. He'd also had a hand in more than half of Missouri's all-time wins as either a player, assistant coach, or head coach.

Although retired from coaching, Stewart continued to keep a busy itinerary of meetings, speaking engagements, travel, and color commentary on Mizzou basketball broadcasts. Stewart is also a member of the council of Coaches Vs. Cancer, a program he founded following his own cancer battle. After collapsing at a Dallas, Texas restaurant in May 2007, Stewart had a pacemaker installed. In late July 2008 Stewart underwent successful open-heart surgery, an aortic valve replacement, at a Columbia, Missouri hospital.

== Halls of Fame ==
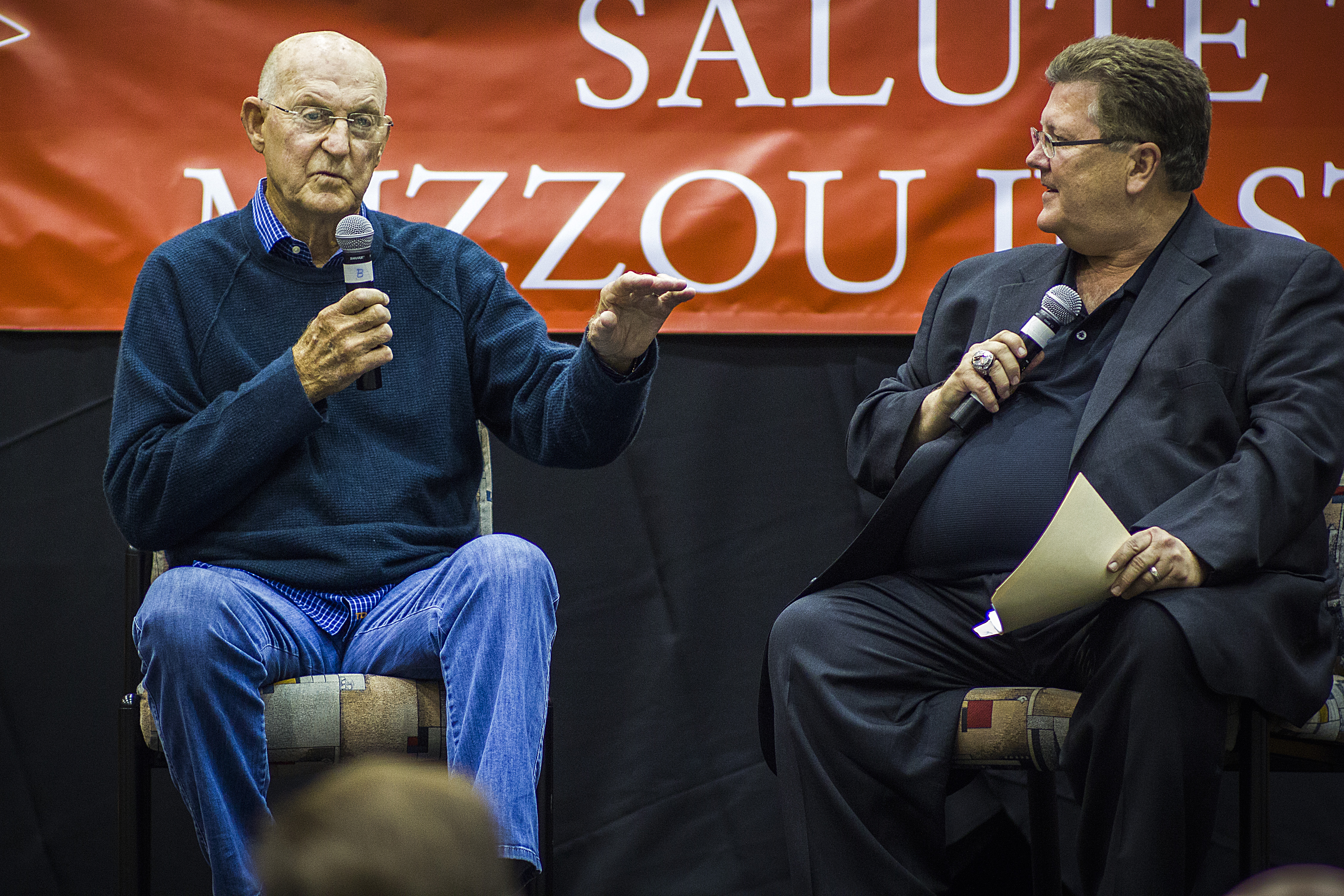
Stewart (left) being interviewed by sportscaster John Rooney (right) during his induction into the St. Louis Sports Hall of Fame.

Norm Stewart's achievements on the basketball court and baseball diamond were recognized in 1990 as he led the inaugural class of the MU Athletics Hall of Fame. He was again given special recognition by the Hall for his coaching career in February 2008. In 2014 Stewart was inducted into the St. Louis Sports Hall of Fame. His highest honor came in November 2007 as Stewart was inducted into the National Collegiate Basketball Hall of Fame.

== Career playing statistics ==
Legend
GP	Games played	GS	Games started	MPG	Minutes per game
FG%	Field goal percentage	3P%	3-point field goal percentage	FT%	Free throw percentage
RPG	Rebounds per game	APG	Assists per game	SPG	Steals per game
BPG	Blocks per game	PPG	Points per game	**Bold**	Career high

=== NBA ===
==== Regular season ====
Year	Team	GP	MPG	FG%	FT%	RPG	APG	PPG
1956–57	St. Louis	5	7.4	.267	.333	1.0	.4	2.0

== Head coaching record ==
Record table
Season	Team	Overall	Conference	Standing	Postseason
**State College of Iowa Panthers** (North Central Conference) (1961–1967)
1961–62	State College of Iowa	19–9	8–4	T–1st	NCAA College Division second round
1962–63	State College of Iowa	15–8	8–4	2nd	
1963–64	State College of Iowa	23–4	11–1	1st	NCAA College Division Fourth Place
1964–65	State College of Iowa	16–7	8–4	2nd	
1965–66	State College of Iowa	13–7	9–3	2nd	
1966–67	State College of Iowa	11–11	6–6	T–2nd	
State College of Iowa:		97–42	50–22		
**Missouri Tigers** (Big Eight Conference) (1967–1996)
1967–68	Missouri	10–16	5–9	6th	
1968–69	Missouri	14–11	7–7	5th	
1969–70	Missouri	15–11	7–7	T–3rd	
1970–71	Missouri	17–9	9–5	T–2nd	
1971–72	Missouri	21–6	10–4	2nd	NIT first round
1972–73	Missouri	21–6	9–5	T–2nd	NIT first round
1973–74	Missouri	12–14	3–11	T–7th	
1974–75	Missouri	18–9	9–5	3rd	NCIT first round
1975–76	Missouri	26–5	12–2	1st	NCAA Division I Elite Eight
1976–77	Missouri	21–8	9–5	3rd	
1977–78	Missouri	14–16	4–10	T–6th	NCAA Division I first round
1978–79	Missouri	13–15	8–6	T–2nd	
1979–80	Missouri	25–6	11–3	1st	NCAA Division I Sweet 16
1980–81	Missouri	22–10	10–4	1st	NCAA Division I first round
1981–82	Missouri	27–4	12–2	1st	NCAA Division I Sweet 16
1982–83	Missouri	26–8	12–2	1st	NCAA Division I second round
1983–84	Missouri	16–14	5–9	T–6th	
1984–85	Missouri	18–14	7–7	T–3rd	NIT first round
1985–86	Missouri	21–14	8–6	T–3rd	NCAA Division I first round
1986–87	Missouri	24–10	11–3	1st	NCAA Division I first round
1987–88	Missouri	19–11	7–7	4th	NCAA Division I first round
1988–89	Missouri	29–8	10–4	2nd	NCAA Division I Sweet 16
1989–90	Missouri	26–6	12–2	1st	NCAA Division I first round
1990–91	Missouri	20–10	8–6	4th	Ineligible
1991–92	Missouri	21–9	8–6	T–2nd	NCAA Division I second round
1992–93	Missouri	19–14	5–9	T–7th	NCAA Division I first round
1993–94	Missouri	28–4	14–0	1st	NCAA Division I Elite Eight
1994–95	Missouri	20–9	8–6	4th	NCAA Division I second round
1995–96	Missouri	18–15	6–8	6th	NIT second round
**Missouri Tigers** (Big 12 Conference) (1996–1999)
1996–97	Missouri	16–17	5–11	10th	
1997–98	Missouri	17–15	8–8	T–5th	NIT first round
1998–99	Missouri	20–9	11–5	T–2nd	NCAA Division I first round
Missouri:		634–333	270–179		
Total:		731–375			
National champion Postseason invitational champion Conference regular season champion Conference regular season and conference tournament champion Division regular season champion Division regular season and conference tournament champion Conference tournament champion

== See also ==
- List of college men's basketball coaches with 600 wins
