= Jack Hartman =

American basketball player-coach (1925–1998)

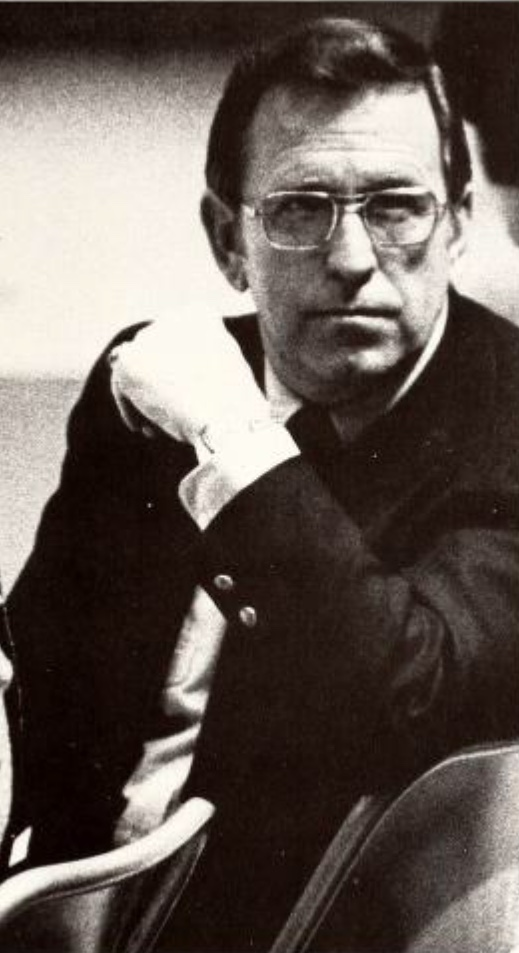
- Hartman in 1976

Biographical details
- Born: October 7, 1925; Dewey, Oklahoma, U.S.
- Died: November 6, 1998 (aged 73); New Mexico, U.S.

Playing career

Football
- 1943: Oklahoma A&M
- 1947–1949: Oklahoma A&M
- 1950: Saskatchewan Roughriders

Basketball
- 1943–1947: Oklahoma A&M
- Position: Quarterback (football)

Coaching career (HC unless noted)

Basketball
- 1954: Oklahoma A&M (assistant)
- 1955–1962: Coffeyville
- 1962–1970: Southern Illinois
- 1970–1986: Kansas State

Head coaching record
- Overall: 589–279 (men's college basketball); 3–4 (women's college basketball)

Accomplishments and honors

Championships
- NJCAA tournament (1962); NIT (1967); 3 Big Eight regular season (1972, 1973, 1977); 2 Big Eight tournament (1977, 1980)

Awards
- NABC Coach of the Year (1981); 2× Big Eight Coach of the Year (1975, 1977)
- College Basketball Hall of Fame; Inducted in 2024
Medal record
Head Coach for United States
Men's national basketball team
Pan American Games
Gold medal – first place	1983 Caracas	Men's Basketball

Jack Hartman (October 7, 1925 – November 6, 1998) was an American football player and college basketball coach.

== Early life and education ==
Hartman played college basketball and football at Oklahoma State University with his basketball tutelage under famed coach Henry Iba.

== Career ==
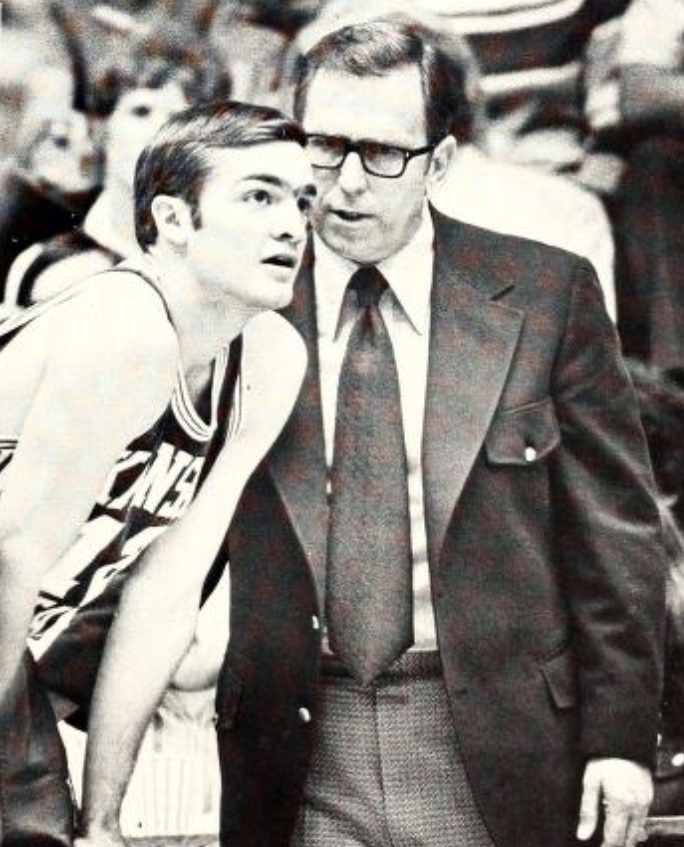
Lon Kruger with Hartman in 1972

After college, he played quarterback in the CFL before becoming a basketball coach. After leading the Coffeyville Junior College basketball team to the NJCAA National Championship with a 32–0 season in 1962, he took his high-octane offense to Southern Illinois University, replacing Harry Gallatin, who left to take the head coaching job with the St. Louis Hawks. In 1967, missing out on the NCAA Division II tournament after two successive second-place finishes, Hartman's Salukis won the NIT Championship, which was much more highly regarded then than it is today. He led Southern Illinois University into Division I before taking over as head coach at Kansas State University when Cotton Fitzsimmons left to coach in the NBA.

Hartman spent 16 seasons as head coach at Kansas State, where he won 294 games and finished in first or second place in the Big Eight Conference in 10 of those 16 seasons. After his retirement, he worked local television color commentary for Kansas State games, and his former player and assistant coach Lon Kruger took over as head coach at Kansas State.

Hartman is credited with introducing a different two-tone uniform, including lavender tops and purple shorts, for Kansas State to wear during its away games, which the Wildcats used from 1973 to 1982. During that stretch, Kansas State posted a record of 186–81 (.697), appeared in five NCAA Tournaments, and won the 1977 and 1980 Big Eight postseason tournaments. Lavender jerseys have since been associated with success at Kansas State, and the school has brought back lavender jerseys on certain occasions as a throwback uniform.

In 1983, he led the United States men's national team, which included Michael Jordan and Chris Mullin, to gold medal at the 1983 Pan American Games in Caracas, Venezuela.

In 1996, when Kansas State fired its women's coach for NCAA violations, Hartman came out of retirement to coach the team for its last seven games, winning three.

Hartman was inducted into the Southern Illinois University Hall of Fame in 1986, the Kansas State University Hall of Fame in 1990, the Kansas State Sports Hall of Fame in 1990, and the National Junior College Hall of Fame in 1991.

Hartman died in 1998. A street near Bramlage Coliseum, Jack Hartman Drive, was named in his honor. His wife, Pat, lived in Manhattan, Kansas, until her death in 2020. His daughter, Jackie, lives in Manhattan and served as the chief of staff for the president of Kansas State University.

== Head coaching record ==
=== Men's college basketball ===
Record table
Season	Team	Overall	Conference	Standing	Postseason
Southern Illinois Salukis (NCAA College Division independent) (1962–1967)
1962–63	Southern Illinois	20–10			NCAA College Division Fourth Place
1963–64	Southern Illinois	15–10			NCAA College Division Regional Runner-up
1964–65	Southern Illinois	20–6			NCAA College Division Runner-up
1965–66	Southern Illinois	21–7			NCAA College Division Runner-up
1966–67	Southern Illinois	24–2			NIT champion
Southern Illinois Salukis (NCAA University Division independent) (1967–1970)
1967–68	Southern Illinois	13–11			
1968–69	Southern Illinois	16–8			NIT First Round
1969–70	Southern Illinois	13–10			
Southern Illinois:		142–64 (.689)			
Kansas State Wildcats (Big Eight Conference) (1970–1986)
1970–71	Kansas State	11–15	6–8	T–5th	
1971–72	Kansas State	19–9	12–2	1st	NCAA University Division Elite Eight
1972–73	Kansas State	23–5	12–2	1st	NCAA University Division Elite Eight
1973–74	Kansas State	19–8	11–3	2nd	
1974–75	Kansas State	20–9	10–4	2nd	NCAA Division I Elite Eight
1975–76	Kansas State	20–8	11–3	2nd	NIT Second Round
1976–77	Kansas State	24–7*	11–3	1st	NCAA Division I Sweet 16
1977–78	Kansas State	18–11	7–7	T–4th	
1978–79	Kansas State	16–12	8–6	T–2nd	
1979–80	Kansas State	22–9	8–6	T–2nd	NCAA Division I Second Round
1980–81	Kansas State	24–9	9–5	T–2nd	NCAA Division I Elite Eight
1981–82	Kansas State	23–8	10–4	2nd	NCAA Division I Sweet 16
1982–83	Kansas State	12–16	4–10	6th	
1983–84	Kansas State	14–15	5–9	T–6th	
1984–85	Kansas State	14–14	5–9	T–5th	
1985–86	Kansas State	16–14	4–10	7th	
Kansas State:		295–169 (.636)	133–91 (.594)		
Total:		589–279 (.679)			
National champion Postseason invitational champion Conference regular season champion Conference regular season and conference tournament champion Division regular season champion Division regular season and conference tournament champion Conference tournament champion

*1976–77 record reflects one win by forfeit over Minnesota.

=== Women's college basketball ===
Record table
Season	Team	Overall	Conference	Standing	Postseason
Kansas State Wildcats (Big Eight Conference) (1996)
1996	Kansas State	3–4	2–2	8th	
Kansas State:		3–4 (.429)	2–2 (.500)		
Total:		3–4 (.429)			
