= 1978–79 Kansas Jayhawks men's basketball team =

American college basketball season

1978–79 Kansas Jayhawks men's basketball
- Conference: Big Eight Conference
- Record: 18–11 (8–6 Big 8)
- Head coach: Ted Owens (15th season)
- Assistant coaches: Lafayette Norwood (1st season); Mark Taylor (1st season)
- Captains: Paul Mokeski; Brad Sanders
- Home arena: Allen Fieldhouse

1978–79 Big Eight Conference men's basketball standings
	Conf.				Overall
Team	W		L	PCT	W		L	PCT
No. 16 Oklahoma †	10	–	4	.714	21	–	10	.677
Missouri	8	–	6	.571	13	–	15	.464
Kansas State	8	–	6	.571	16	–	12	.571
Kansas	8	–	6	.571	18	–	11	.621
Nebraska	7	–	7	.500	14	–	13	.519
Iowa State	6	–	8	.429	11	–	16	.407
Oklahoma State	5	–	9	.357	12	–	15	.444
Colorado	4	–	10	.286	14	–	13	.519
† 1979 Big Eight tournament winner Rankings from AP Poll

The 1978–79 Kansas Jayhawks men's basketball team represented the University of Kansas during the 1978–79 NCAA Division I men's basketball season.

== Roster ==
- Darnell Valentine
- Paul Mokeski
- John Crawford
- Wilmore Fowler
- Tony Guy
- Douglas Booty Neal
- Dave Magley
- Mac Stallcup
- Brad Sanders
- Chester Giles
- Randolph Carroll
- Mark Snow

== Schedule ==
Date time, TV	Rank^{#}	Opponent^{#}	Result	Record	Site city, state
November 29*	No. 4	Fairleigh Dickinson	W 91-68	1-0	Allen Fieldhouse; Lawrence, KS
December 2*	No. 4	Murray State	W 81-66	2-0	Allen Fieldhouse; Lawrence, KS
December 4*	No. 4	Boise State	W 82-68	3-0	Allen Fieldhouse; Lawrence, KS
December 5*	No. 5	Oral Roberts	W 90-77	4-0	Allen Fieldhouse; Lawrence, KS
December 9*	No. 5	at No. 10 Kentucky	L 66-67 ^{OT}	4-1	Rupp Arena; Lexington, KY
December 16*	No. 8	SMU	W 71-64	5-1	Allen Fieldhouse; Lawrence, KS
December 21*	No. 7	at No. 20 USC	L 83-89 ^{OT}	5-2	Los Angeles Memorial Sports Arena; Los Angeles, CA
December 23*	No. 7	at San Diego State	L 69-81	5-3	Peterson Gym; San Diego, CA
December 27	No. 18	vs. Iowa State	W 75-55	6-3	Kemper Arena; Kansas City, MO
December 29	No. 18	vs. Oklahoma	W 86-75	7-3	Kemper Arena; Kansas City, MO
December 30*	No. 18	vs. Colorado	W 72-66	8-3	Kemper Arena; Kansas City, MO
January 10	No. 15	at No. 13 Oklahoma	L 45-68	8-4 (0-1)	Lloyd Noble Center; Norman, OK
January 13	No. 15	at Oklahoma State	W 82-70	9-4 (1-1)	Gallagher-Iba Arena; Stillwater, OK
January 17	No. 20	Missouri; Border War	L 55-58	9-5 (1-2)	Allen Fieldhouse; Lawrence, KS
January 20	No. 20	at Kansas State; Sunflower Showdown	L 69-96	9-6 (1-3)	Ahearn Field House; Manhattan, KS
January 24		Iowa State	W 80-71	10-6 (2-3)	Allen Fieldhouse; Lawrence, KS
January 27		at Nebraska	L 64-66 ^{OT}	10-7 (2-4)	Bob Devaney Sports Center; Lincoln, NE
January 31		Colorado	W 56-51	11-7 (3-4)	Allen Fieldhouse; Lawrence, KS
February 2		Oklahoma State	W 82-71	12-7 (4-4)	Allen Fieldhouse; Lawrence, KS
February 4*		at No. 14 Michigan State	L 61-85	12-8	Jenison Fieldhouse; East Lansing, MI
February 7		at Missouri; Border War	W 88-85	13-8 (5-4)	Hearnes Center; Columbia, MO
February 10		Oklahoma	W 74-62	14-8 (6-4)	Allen Fieldhouse; Lawrence, KS
February 14		at Iowa State	L 66-68	14-9 (6-5)	James H. Hilton Coliseum; Ames, IA
February 17		Kansas State; Sunflower Showdown	L 56-58	14-10 (6-6)	Allen Fieldhouse; Lawrence, KS
February 21		Nebraska	W 66-59	15-10 (7-6)	Allen Fieldhouse; Lawrence, KS
February 24		at Colorado	W 71-60	16-10 (8-6)	Balch Fieldhouse; Boulder, CO
February 27		Iowa State; Big Eight Conference men's basketball tournament Quarterfinals	W 91-70	17-10	Allen Fieldhouse; Lawrence, KS
March 2		vs. Missouri; Big Eight Conference men's basketball tournament semifinals Border War	W 76-73	18-10	Kemper Arena; Kansas City, MO
March 3		vs. Oklahoma; Big Eight Conference men's basketball tournament championship Game	L 65-80	18-11	Kemper Arena; Kansas City, MO
*Non-conference game. ^{#}Rankings from AP Poll. (#) Tournament seedings in parentheses.
