= 1976–77 Texas Longhorns men's basketball team =

American college basketball season

1976–77 Texas Longhorns men's basketball
- Conference: Southwest Conference
- Record: 13–13 (8–8 SWC)
- Head coach: Abe Lemons (1st season)
- Home arena: Gregory Gymnasium

1976–77 Southwest Conference men's basketball standings
	Conf.				Overall
Team	W		L	PCT	W		L	PCT
No. 18 Arkansas†	16	–	0	1.000	26	–	2	.929
Houston	13	–	3	.813	29	–	8	.784
Texas Tech	12	–	4	.750	20	–	9	.690
Texas	8	–	8	.500	13	–	13	.500
Texas A&M	8	–	8	.500	14	–	14	.500
SMU	7	–	9	.438	8	–	19	.296
Baylor	5	–	11	.313	11	–	17	.393
Rice	3	–	13	.188	9	–	18	.333
TCU	0	–	16	.000	3	–	23	.115
† 1977 SWC tournament winner Rankings from AP Poll

The 1976–77 Texas Longhorns men's basketball team represented the University of Texas at Austin in the 1976–77 NCAA Division I men's basketball season as a member of the Southwest Conference. They finished the season 13–13 overall, tied for fourth in the SWC with a 8–8 record. They were coached by Abe Lemons in his first season as head coach of the Longhorns. Lemons previously coached at Pan American University and Oklahoma City University. The Longhorns played their home games at Gregory Gymnasium in Austin, Texas.

== Schedule ==
Date time, TV	Rank^{#}	Opponent^{#}	Result	Record	Site city, state
Regular season
November 29, 1976*		Oklahoma State	W 74–73	1–0	Gregory Gymnasium; Austin, TX
December 1, 1976*		Oklahoma	L 56–60	1–1	Gregory Gymnasium; Austin, TX
December 3, 1976*		Wisconsin–Stout	W 78–63	2–1	Gregory Gymnasium; Austin, TX
December 6, 1976*		USC	W 66–61	3–1	Gregory Gymnasium; Austin, TX
December 11, 1976*		at Wisconsin–Stout	L 89–91	3–2	Humphrey Coliseum; Starkville, MS
December 23, 1976*		at Oklahoma City	L 65–66	3–3	Frederickson Fieldhouse; Oklahoma City, OK
December 28, 1976*		at Providence	L 67–81	3–4	Providence Civic Center; Providence, RI
December 29, 1976*		at Providence	W 76–66	4–4	Keaney Gymnasium; Kingston, RI
January 4, 1977		at Texas A&M	L 59–68	4–5 (0–1)	G. Rollie White Coliseum; College Station, TX
January 8, 1977		Baylor	L 73–75	4–6 (0–2)	Gregory Gymnasium; Austin, TX
January 10, 1977		Texas A&M	W 87–73	5–6 (1–2)	Gregory Gymnasium; Austin, TX
January 12, 1977		at SMU	L 59–68	5–7 (1–3)	Moody Coliseum; University Park, TX
January 15, 1977		Texas Tech	L 59–68	6–7 (2–3)	Gregory Gymnasium; Austin, TX
January 18, 1977		at Houston	L 81–95	6–8 (2–4)	Hofheinz Pavilion; Houston, TX
January 22, 1977		No. 17 Arkansas	L 58–86	6–9 (2–5)	Gregory Gymnasium; Austin, TX
January 24, 1977		at Rice	W 74–68	7–9 (3–5)	Rice Gymnasium; Houston, TX
January 29, 1977		TCU	W 89–80	8–9 (4–5)	Gregory Gymnasium; Austin, TX
February 1, 1977*		Centenary	W 105–81	9–9	Gregory Gymnasium; Austin, TX
February 5, 1977		at Baylor	W 75–72 ^{2OT}	10–9 (5–5)	Heart O' Texas Fair Complex; Waco, TX
February 8, 1977		SMU	W 79–69	11–9 (6–5)	Gregory Gymnasium; Austin, TX
February 10, 1977		at TCU	W 81–69	12–9 (7–5)	Daniel–Meyer Coliseum; Fort Worth, TX
February 12, 1977		at Texas Tech	L 69–87	12–10 (7–6)	Lubbock Municipal Coliseum; Lubbock, TX
February 15, 1977		Houston	L 84–95	12–11 (7–7)	Gregory Gymnasium; Austin, TX
February 19, 1977		at No. 11 Arkansas	L 61–73	12–12 (7–8)	Barnhill Arena; Fayetteville, AR
February 22, 1977		Rice	W 90–51	13–12 (8–8)	Gregory Gymnasium; Austin, TX
SWC tournament
February 26, 1977	(4)	(7) Baylor; First Round	L 70–72	13–13	Gregory Gymnasium; Austin, TX
*Non-conference game. ^{#}Rankings from AP Poll. (#) Tournament seedings in parentheses. All times are in Central Time.
