= 1977 Big Eight Conference men's basketball tournament =

Inaugural men's basketball tournament

- Classification: Division I
- Season: 1976–77
- Teams: 8
- First round site: Campus Sites; Campus Arenas
- Finals site: Kemper Arena; Kansas City, MO
- Champions: Kansas State (1st title)
- Winning coach: Jack Hartman (1st title)
- MVP: Mike Evans (Kansas State)

1976–77 Big Eight Conference men's basketball standings
	Conf.				Overall
Team	W		L	PCT	W		L	PCT
No. 16 Kansas State †	11	–	3	.786	23	–	8	.742
Missouri	9	–	5	.643	21	–	8	.724
Oklahoma	9	–	5	.643	18	–	10	.643
Kansas	8	–	6	.571	18	–	10	.643
Nebraska	7	–	7	.500	15	–	14	.517
Colorado	5	–	9	.357	11	–	16	.407
Oklahoma State	4	–	10	.286	10	–	17	.370
Iowa State	3	–	11	.214	7	–	20	.259
† 1977 Big Eight tournament winner Rankings from AP Poll

The 1977 Big Eight Conference men's basketball tournament was held March 1–4 at Kemper Arena in Kansas City, Missouri. This was the inaugural edition of the tournament.

Kansas State defeated Missouri in the championship game, 72–67 (in overtime), to take home their first Big 8 men's basketball tournament.

The Wildcats, in turn, received a bid to the 1977 NCAA tournament. Kansas State was the only Big 8 team to qualify for the tournament.

== Format ==
All eight of the conference's members participated in the tournament field. They were seeded based on regular season conference records, with all teams beginning play in the initial quarterfinal round.

All first round games were played on the home court of the higher-seeded team. The semifinals and championship game, in turn, were played at a neutral site at Kemper Arena in Kansas City, Missouri.

== Bracket ==
Quarterfinals; Tuesday, March 1
1	Kansas State	97
8	Iowa State	62
5	Nebraska	58
4	Kansas	61
3	Oklahoma	68
6	Colorado	56
7	Oklahoma State	74
2	Missouri	92

Semifinals; Thursday, March 3
1	Kansas State	80
4	Kansas	67
3	Oklahoma	72
2	Missouri	90

Championship; Friday, March 4
1	Kansas State	72*
2	Missouri	67
