= 1977–78 Missouri Tigers men's basketball team =

American college basketball season

1977–78 Missouri Tigers men's basketball

Big Eight tournament champions

NCAA Tournament
- Conference: Big Eight Conference
- Record: 14–16 (4–10 Big 8)
- Head coach: Norm Stewart (11th season)
- Assistant coach: Gary Garner (1st season)
- Home arena: Hearnes Center

1977–78 Big Eight Conference men's basketball standings
	Conf.				Overall
Team	W		L	PCT	W		L	PCT
No. 10 Kansas	13	–	1	.929	24	–	5	.828
Iowa State	9	–	5	.643	14	–	13	.519
Nebraska	9	–	5	.643	22	–	8	.733
Kansas State	7	–	7	.500	18	–	11	.621
Oklahoma	7	–	7	.500	14	–	13	.519
Oklahoma State	4	–	10	.286	10	–	16	.385
Missouri †	4	–	10	.286	14	–	16	.467
Colorado	3	–	11	.214	9	–	18	.333
† 1978 Big Eight tournament winner Rankings from AP Poll

The 1977–78 Missouri Tigers men's basketball team represented the University of Missouri during the 1977–78 NCAA men's basketball season. Led by legendary coach Norm Stewart, the Tigers finished seventh in the Big 8 regular season standings, but won the Big 8 Tournament to receive the conference's automatic bid to the NCAA tournament. Missouri was eliminated by Utah in double overtime to finish with a 14–16 record (4–10 Big 8).

== Roster ==
1977–78 Missouri Tigers men's basketball team
Players	Coaches
Pos. / # / Name / Height / Weight / Year / Hometown; G / 22 / Larry Drew / — / — / So	Head coach: Norm Stewart; Assistant coach(es) Legend: (C) Team captain; (S) Suspended; (I) Ineligible; (W) Walk-on; Injured; Current redshirt

== Schedule and results ==
Date time, TV	Rank^{#}	Opponent^{#}	Result	Record	Site city, state
Regular season
Nov 28, 1977*		Midwestern State	W 81–73	1–0	Hearnes Center; Columbia, Missouri
Dec 2, 1977*		Butler; Show-Me Classic	W 87–66	2–0	Hearnes Center; Columbia, Missouri
Dec 3, 1977*		UTEP; Show-Me Classic	W 74–63	3–0	Hearnes Center; Columbia, Missouri
Dec 6, 1977*		at Illinois; Show-Me Classic	L 85–96	3–1	Assembly Hall; Champaign, Illinois
Dec 10, 1977*		at Alabama	L 71–75	3–2	Coleman Coliseum; Tuscaloosa, Alabama
Dec 13, 1977*		Valparaiso	W 91–75	4–2	Hearnes Center; Columbia, Missouri
Dec 16, 1977*		Cal Poly Pomona	W 70–60	5–2	Hearnes Center; Columbia, Missouri
Dec 23, 1977*		vs. Florida State	L 64–97	5–3	Harold & Ted Alfond Sports Center (2,000); Orlando, Florida
Dec 28, 1977*		vs. No. 17 Kansas; Border War · Big Eight Preseason Tournament	L 49–96	5–4	Kemper Arena; Kansas City, Missouri
Dec 29, 1977*; 3:05 p.m.		vs. Iowa State; Big Eight Preseason Tournament Consolation Semifinals	W 66–62	6–4	Kemper Arena (7,252); Kansas City, Missouri
Dec 30, 1977*		vs. Oklahoma State; Big Eight Preseason Tournament	W 87–75	7–4	Kemper Arena; Kansas City, Missouri
Jan 7, 1978		No. 14 Kansas; Border War	L 67–71	7–5 (0–1)	Hearnes Center; Columbia, Missouri
Jan 9, 1978*		No. 4 Marquette	L 52–70	7–6	Hearnes Center; Columbia, Missouri
Jan 11, 1978		at Oklahoma	L 70–73 ^{OT}	7–7 (0–2)	Lloyd Noble Center; Norman, Oklahoma
Jan 14, 1978		Oklahoma State	W 85–70	8–7 (1–2)	Hearnes Center; Columbia, Missouri
Jan 18, 1978		Colorado	W 70–68 ^{OT}	9–7 (2–2)	Hearnes Center; Columbia, Missouri
Jan 21, 1978		at Nebraska	L 55–56	9–8 (2–3)	Bob Devaney Sports Center; Lincoln, Nebraska
Jan 25, 1978		Kansas State	W 65–60	10–8 (3–3)	Hearnes Center; Columbia, Missouri
Jan 28, 1978; 7:35 p.m.		at Iowa State	L 59–68	10–9 (3–4)	Hilton Coliseum; Ames, Iowa
Feb 1, 1978		Oklahoma	L 64–65	10–10 (3–5)	Hearnes Center; Columbia, Missouri
Feb 4, 1978		at Oklahoma State	L 52–62	10–11 (3–6)	Gallagher-Iba Arena; Stillwater, Oklahoma
Feb 8, 1978		at No. 8 Kansas; Border War	L 52–72	10–12 (3–7)	Allen Fieldhouse; Lawrence, Kansas
Feb 11, 1978		No. 19 Nebraska	W 74–52	11–12 (4–7)	Hearnes Center; Columbia, Missouri
Feb 15, 1978		at Colorado	L 63–69	11–13 (4–8)	Balch Fieldhouse; Boulder, Colorado
Feb 18, 1978		at Kansas State	L 54–67	11–14 (4–9)	Ahearn Field House; Manhattan, Kansas
Feb 25, 1978; 7:35 p.m.		Iowa State	L 63–67	11–15 (4–10)	Hearnes Center; Columbia, Missouri
Big 8 Tournament
Feb 28, 1978*; 7:35 p.m.	(7)	at (2) Iowa State; Quarterfinals	W 65–63	12–15	Hilton Coliseum; Ames, Iowa
Mar 3, 1978*	(7)	(3) Nebraska; Semifinals	W 61–58	13–15	Kemper Arena; Kansas City, Missouri
Mar 4, 1978*	(7)	(4) Kansas State; Championship game	W 71–68 ^{2OT}	14–15	Kemper Arena; Kansas City, Missouri
NCAA Tournament
Mar 12, 1978*	(MW 1Q)	vs. (MW 3L) No. 15 Utah; First round	L 79–86 ^{2OT}	14–16	Levitt Arena; Wichita, Kansas
*Non-conference game. ^{#}Rankings from AP Poll. (#) Tournament seedings in parentheses. MW=Midwest. All times are in Central Time.
