= 1976–77 Kansas State Wildcats men's basketball team =

American college basketball season

1976–77 Kansas State Wildcats men's basketball

Big Eight tournament champions

NCAA tournament, Sweet Sixteen
- Conference: Big Eight Conference

Ranking
- Coaches: No. 11
- AP: No. 16
- Record: 23–8 (11–3 Big Eight)
- Head coach: Jack Hartman (7th season)
- Home arena: Ahearn Field House

1976–77 Big Eight Conference men's basketball standings
	Conf.				Overall
Team	W		L	PCT	W		L	PCT
No. 16 Kansas State †	11	–	3	.786	23	–	8	.742
Missouri	9	–	5	.643	21	–	8	.724
Oklahoma	9	–	5	.643	18	–	10	.643
Kansas	8	–	6	.571	18	–	10	.643
Nebraska	7	–	7	.500	15	–	14	.517
Colorado	5	–	9	.357	11	–	16	.407
Oklahoma State	4	–	10	.286	10	–	17	.370
Iowa State	3	–	11	.214	7	–	20	.259
† 1977 Big Eight tournament winner Rankings from AP Poll

The 1976–77 Kansas State Wildcats men's basketball team represented Kansas State University as a member of the Big Eight Conference in the 1976–77 NCAA Division I men's basketball season. The team was led by head coach Jack Hartman and played their home games at Ahearn Field House in Manhattan, Kansas. The Wildcats, finished atop the conference regular season standings. K-State also won the Big Eight tournament and received an automatic bid to the NCAA tournament. The Wildcats beat Providence in the opening round, then fell to eventual National champion Marquette ( 67–66) in the Midwest regional semifinal. Kansas State finished with a record of 23–8 (11–3 Big Eight).

== Roster ==
1976–77 Kansas State Wildcats men's basketball team
Players
Coaches

Pos.	#	Name	Height	Weight	Year	Hometown
G	12	Mike Evans	6 ft 1 in (1.85 m)	170 lb (77 kg)	Jr	Brooklyn, New York
F	31	Curtis Redding	6 ft 5 in (1.96 m)	—	Fr	Brooklyn, New York

Head coach

- Jack Hartman

Assistant coach(es)

Legend

- (C) Team captain
- (S) Suspended
- (I) Ineligible
- (W) Walk-on
- Injured
- Current redshirt

Roster

== Schedule and results ==
Date time, TV	Rank^{#}	Opponent^{#}	Result	Record	Site city, state
Non-conference Regular season
Nov 27, 1976*		Vanderbilt	W 89–66	1–0	Ahearn Field House; Manhattan, Kansas
Nov 29, 1976*		Arkansas State	W 83–61	2–0	Ahearn Field House; Manhattan, Kansas
Dec 2, 1976*		Cal Poly	W 87–68	3–0	Ahearn Field House; Manhattan, Kansas
Dec 4, 1976*		at SMU	W 103–85	4–0	Moody Coliseum; Dallas, Texas
Dec 6, 1976*		at North Texas	L 83–87	4–1	Super Pit; Denton, Texas
Dec 8, 1976*		Northern Illinois	W 79–58	5–1	Ahearn Field House; Manhattan, Kansas
Dec 18, 1976*		Central Missouri State	W 85–55	6–1	Ahearn Field House; Manhattan, Kansas
Dec 20, 1976*		at No. 18 Arkansas	L 65–80	6–2	Barnhill Arena; Fayetteville, Arkansas
Dec 23, 1976*		at No. 20 Minnesota	L 60–62	6–3	Williams Arena; Minneapolis, Minnesota
Dec 27, 1976*		vs. Oklahoma State; Big Eight Holiday Tournament	W 74–56	7–3	Kemper Arena; Kansas City, Missouri
Dec 29, 1976*		vs. Kansas; Big Eight Holiday Tournament	L 64–81	7–4	Kemper Arena; Kansas City, Missouri
Dec 30, 1976*		vs. Colorado; Big Eight Holiday Tournament	W 62–55	8–4	Kemper Arena; Kansas City, Missouri
Big Eight Regular season
Jan 8, 1977		at Nebraska	W 57–52	9–4 (1–0)	Bob Devaney Sports Center; Lincoln, Nebraska
Feb 23, 1977		Oklahoma	W 68–55	19–7 (11–3)	Ahearn Field House; Manhattan, Kansas
Big Eight Tournament
Mar 1, 1977*		Iowa State; Quarterfinals	W 97–62	20–7	Ahearn Field House; Manhattan, Kansas
Mar 3, 1977*		vs. Kansas; Semifinals	W 80–67	21–7	Kemper Arena; Kansas City, Missouri
Mar 4, 1977*		vs. Missouri; Championship game	W 72–67 ^{OT}	22–7	Kemper Arena; Kansas City, Missouri
NCAA Tournament
Mar 12, 1977*		vs. No. 13 Providence; First round	W 87–80	23–7	Lloyd Noble Center; Norman, Oklahoma
Mar 17, 1977*	No. 16	vs. No. 7 Marquette; Midwest Regional Semifinal – Sweet Sixteen	L 66–67	23–8	Myriad Convention Center; Oklahoma City, Oklahoma
*Non-conference game. ^{#}Rankings from AP Poll. (#) Tournament seedings in parentheses. MW=Midwest.

== Awards and honors ==
- Mike Evans – Big Eight Player of the Year
