= 1976–77 Houston Cougars men's basketball team =

American college basketball season

1976–77 Houston Cougars men's basketball
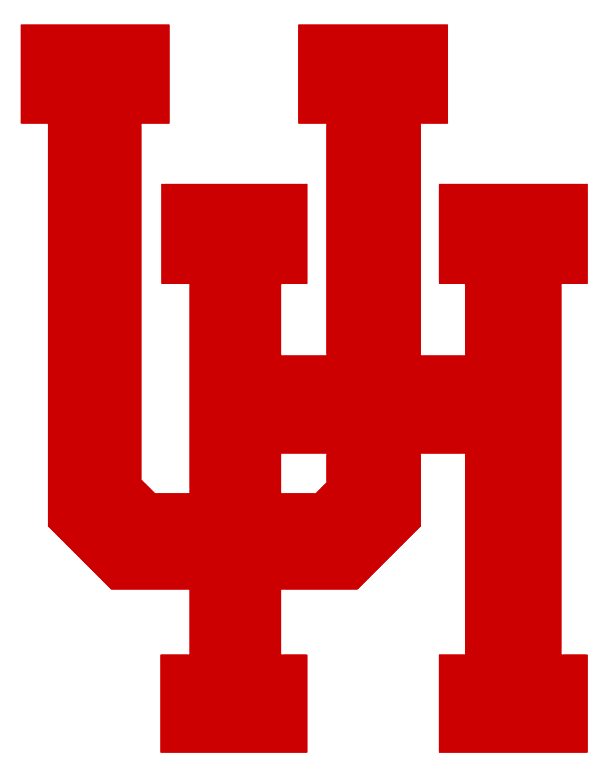

NIT, Runner-up
- Conference: Southwest Conference
- Record: 29–8 (13–3 SWC)
- Head coach: Guy Lewis (21st season)
- Assistant coaches: Harvey Pate; Don Schverak
- Home arena: Hofheinz Pavilion

1976–77 Southwest Conference men's basketball standings
| | Conf. | | | | Overall |
| Team | W | | L | PCT | W | | L | PCT |
|---|---|---|---|---|---|---|---|---|
| No. 18 Arkansas† | 16 | – | 0 | 1.000 | 26 | – | 2 | .929 |
| Houston | 13 | – | 3 | .813 | 29 | – | 8 | .784 |
| Texas Tech | 12 | – | 4 | .750 | 20 | – | 9 | .690 |
| Texas | 8 | – | 8 | .500 | 13 | – | 13 | .500 |
| Texas A&M | 8 | – | 8 | .500 | 14 | – | 14 | .500 |
| SMU | 7 | – | 9 | .438 | 8 | – | 19 | .296 |
| Baylor | 5 | – | 11 | .313 | 11 | – | 17 | .393 |
| Rice | 3 | – | 13 | .188 | 9 | – | 18 | .333 |
| TCU | 0 | – | 16 | .000 | 3 | – | 23 | .115 |
† 1977 SWC tournament winner Rankings from AP Poll

The 1976–77 Houston Cougars men's basketball team represented the University of Houston in NCAA Division I competition in the 1976–77 season.

Houston, coached by Guy Lewis, played its home games in the Hofheinz Pavilion in Houston, Texas, and was then a member of the Southwest Conference.

== Roster ==
1976–77 Houston Cougars men's basketball team
Players
Coaches

| Pos. | # | Name | Height | Weight | Year | Previous school | Hometown |
|---|---|---|---|---|---|---|---|
| G | 00 | Cecile Rose | 6 ft 6 in (1.98 m) | 189 lb (86 kg) | Jr | | Nassau, The Bahamas |
| G | 10 | Otis Birdsong | 6 ft 3 in (1.91 m) | 190 lb (86 kg) | Sr | Winter Haven HS | Winter Haven, Florida |
| G | 14 | Ken Ciolli | 6 ft 0 in (1.83 m) | — | So |
| C | 30 | Mike Schultz | 6 ft 9 in (2.06 m) | — | Jr |
| F | 40 | Cedric Fears | 6 ft 6 in (1.98 m) | — | So |
| F | 44 | Charles Thompson | 6 ft 7 in (2.01 m) | 230 lb (104 kg) | Jr |

Head coach

- Guy Lewis (Houston)

Assistant coach(es)

- Harvey Pate (Oklahoma State)
- Don Schverak (Houston)

Legend

- (C) Team captain
- (S) Suspended
- (I) Ineligible
- (W) Walk-on
- Injured
- Current redshirt

Roster

== Schedule and results ==
| Date time, TV | Rank^{#} | Opponent^{#} | Result | Record | Site city, state |
Regular season
| Nov 28, 1976* | | Texas Lutheran | W 96–69 | 1–0 | Hofheinz Pavilion; Houston, Texas |
| Dec 1, 1976* | | at Lamar | W 101–92 | 2–0 | McDonald Gym; Beaumont, Texas |
| Dec 3, 1976* | | Biscayne | W 104–64 | 3–0 | Hofheinz Pavilion; Houston, Texas |
| Dec 6, 1976* | | at No. 6 San Francisco | L 85–100 | 3–1 | War Memorial Gymnasium; San Francisco, California |
| Dec 11, 1976* | | Trinity (TX) | W 124–67 | 4–1 | Hofheinz Pavilion; Houston, Texas |
| Dec 13, 1976* | | Lamar | W 103–83 | 5–1 | Hofheinz Pavilion; Houston, Texas |
| Dec 17, 1976* | | Nevada; Bluebonnet Classic | W 100–78 | 6–1 | Hofheinz Pavilion; Houston, Texas |
| Dec 18, 1976* | | UC Santa Barbara; Bluebonnet Classic | W 77–62 | 7–1 | Hofheinz Pavilion; Houston, Texas |
| Dec 27, 1976* | | vs. Illinois; Rainbow Classic | W 69–66 | 8–1 | Neal S. Blaisdell Center; Honolulu, Hawaii |
| Dec 29, 1976* | | at Hawaii; Rainbow Classic | W 101–74 | 9–1 | Neal S. Blaisdell Center; Honolulu, Hawaii |
| Dec 30, 1976* | | vs. No. 3 San Francisco; Rainbow Classic | L 81–86 | 9–2 | Neal S. Blaisdell Center; Honolulu, Hawaii |
| Jan 2, 1977* | | at No. 8 UCLA | L 83–96 | 9–3 | Pauley Pavilion; Los Angeles, California |
| Jan 6, 1977* | | Houston Baptist | W 111–79 | 10–3 | Hofheinz Pavilion; Houston, Texas |
| Jan 8, 1977 | | at No. 18 Arkansas | L 70–81 | 10–4 (0–1) | Barnhill Arena; Fayetteville, Arkansas |
| Jan 12, 1977 | | Rice | W 106–56 | 11–4 (1–1) | Hofheinz Pavilion; Houston, Texas |
| Jan 15, 1977 | | at TCU | W 78–74 | 12–4 (2–1) | Daniel-Meyer Coliseum; Fort Worth, Texas |
| Jan 18, 1977 | | Texas | W 95–81 | 13–4 (3–1) | Hofheinz Pavilion; Houston, Texas |
| Jan 22, 1977 | | at Texas A&M | W 78–71 | 14–4 (4–1) | G. Rollie White Coliseum; College Station, Texas |
| Jan 24, 1977 | | Baylor | W 111–89 | 15–4 (5–1) | Hofheinz Pavilion; Houston, Texas |
| Jan 27, 1977 | | at Texas Tech | L 83–84 ^{OT} | 15–5 (5–2) | Lubbock Municipal Coliseum; Lubbock, Texas |
| Jan 29, 1977 | | at SMU | W 103–102 | 16–5 (6–2) | Moody Coliseum; University Park, Texas |
| Feb 1, 1977 | | Texas Tech | W 94–87 | 17–5 (7–2) | Hofheinz Pavilion; Houston, Texas |
| Feb 5, 1977 | | No. 14 Arkansas | L 80–82 | 17–6 (7–3) | Hofheinz Pavilion; Houston, Texas |
| Feb 8, 1977 | | at Rice | W 109–73 | 18–6 (8–3) | Rice Gymnasium; Houston, Texas |
| Feb 10, 1977 | | SMU | W 115–83 | 19–6 (9–3) | Hofheinz Pavilion; Houston, Texas |
| Feb 12, 1977 | | TCU | W 114–74 | 20–6 (10–3) | Hofheinz Pavilion; Houston, Texas |
| Feb 15, 1977 | | at Texas | W 95–84 | 21–6 (11–3) | Gregory Gymnasium; Austin, Texas |
| Feb 19, 1977 | | Texas A&M | W 116–83 | 22–6 (12–3) | Hofheinz Pavilion; Houston, Texas |
| Feb 23, 1977 | | at Baylor | W 78–76 | 23–6 (13–3) | Heart O' Texas Coliseum; Waco, Texas |
SWC tournament
| Feb 26, 1977* | (2) | (9) TCU; First round | W 111–67 | 24–6 | Hofheinz Pavilion; Houston, Texas |
| Mar 3, 1977* | (2) | vs. (5) Texas A&M; Quarterfinals | W 96–77 | 25–6 | The Summit; Houston, Texas |
| Mar 4, 1977* | (2) | vs. (3) Texas Tech; Semifinals | W 94–83 | 26–6 | The Summit; Houston, Texas |
| Mar 5, 1977* | (2) | vs. (1) No. 7 Arkansas; Championship | L 70–84 | 26–7 | The Summit; Houston, Texas |
NIT
| Mar 9, 1977* | | Indiana State; First round | W 83–82 | 27–7 | Hofheinz Pavilion; Houston, Texas |
| Mar 14, 1977* | | vs. Illinois State; Quarterfinals | W 91–90 | 28–7 | Madison Square Garden; New York City, New York |
| Mar 17, 1977* | | vs. No. 11 Alabama; Semifinals | W 82–76 | 29–7 | Madison Square Garden; New York City, New York |
| Mar 20, 1977* | | vs. St. Bonaventure; Championship | L 91–94 | 29–8 | Madison Square Garden; New York City, New York |
*Non-conference game. ^{#}Rankings from AP Poll. (#) Tournament seedings in parentheses. All times are in Central Time.

== Rankings ==
Ranking movements Legend: ██ Increase in ranking ██ Decrease in ranking — = Not ranked
| | Week | | | | | | | | | | | | | | | |
| Poll | Pre | 1 | 2 | 3 | 4 | 5 | 6 | 7 | 8 | 9 | 10 | 11 | 12 | 13 | 14 | Final |
|---|---|---|---|---|---|---|---|---|---|---|---|---|---|---|---|---|
| AP | — | — | — | — | — | — | — | — | — | — | — | — | — | — | — | — |
| Coaches | — | — | — | — | — | — | — | — | — | — | — | — | — | 19 | 18 | — |
