= 1978 Big Eight Conference men's basketball tournament =

- Classification: Division I
- Season: 1977–78
- Teams: 8
- First round site: Campus Sites; Campus Arenas
- Finals site: Kemper Arena; Kansas City, MO
- Champions: Missouri (1st title)
- Winning coach: Norm Stewart (1st title)
- MVP: Stan Ray (Missouri)

1977–78 Big Eight Conference men's basketball standings
	Conf.				Overall
Team	W		L	PCT	W		L	PCT
No. 10 Kansas	13	–	1	.929	24	–	5	.828
Iowa State	9	–	5	.643	14	–	13	.519
Nebraska	9	–	5	.643	22	–	8	.733
Kansas State	7	–	7	.500	18	–	11	.621
Oklahoma	7	–	7	.500	14	–	13	.519
Oklahoma State	4	–	10	.286	10	–	16	.385
Missouri †	4	–	10	.286	14	–	16	.467
Colorado	3	–	11	.214	9	–	18	.333
† 1978 Big Eight tournament winner Rankings from AP Poll

The 1978 Big Eight Conference men's basketball tournament was held February 28–March 4 at a combination of on-campus gymnasiums and Kemper Arena in Kansas City, Missouri.

Seventh-seeded Missouri upset defending champions Kansas State in the championship game, 71–68 (in double overtime), to capture their first Big Eight men's basketball tournament.

The Tigers, in turn, received a bid to the 1978 NCAA tournament. They were joined in the tournament by the Big 8's regular season champion, Kansas, who earned at-large bid.

== Format ==
All eight of the conference's members participated in the tournament field. They were seeded based on regular season conference records, with all teams beginning play in the initial quarterfinal round.

All first round games were played on the home court of the higher-seeded team. The semifinals and championship game, in turn, were played at a neutral site at Kemper Arena in Kansas City, Missouri.

== Bracket ==
Quarterfinals; Tuesday, February 28
1	Kansas	82
8	Colorado	66
5	Oklahoma	44
4	Kansas State	52
3	Nebraska	71
6	Oklahoma State	63
7	Missouri	65
2	Iowa State	63

Semifinals; Friday, March 3
1	Kansas	76
4	Kansas State	87
3	Nebraska	58
7	Missouri	61

Championship; Saturday, March 4
4	Kansas State	68
7	Missouri	71**
