= 1976–77 Kansas Jayhawks men's basketball team =

American college basketball season

1976–77 Kansas Jayhawks men's basketball
- Conference: Big Eight Conference
- Record: 18–10 (8–6 Big 8)
- Head coach: Ted Owens (13th season)
- Assistant coaches: Sam Miranda (11th season); Duncan Reid (4th season)
- Captain: Ken Koenigs
- Home arena: Allen Fieldhouse

1976–77 Big Eight Conference men's basketball standings
	Conf.				Overall
Team	W		L	PCT	W		L	PCT
No. 16 Kansas State †	11	–	3	.786	23	–	8	.742
Missouri	9	–	5	.643	21	–	8	.724
Oklahoma	9	–	5	.643	18	–	10	.643
Kansas	8	–	6	.571	18	–	10	.643
Nebraska	7	–	7	.500	15	–	14	.517
Colorado	5	–	9	.357	11	–	16	.407
Oklahoma State	4	–	10	.286	10	–	17	.370
Iowa State	3	–	11	.214	7	–	20	.259
† 1977 Big Eight tournament winner Rankings from AP Poll

The 1976–77 Kansas Jayhawks men's basketball team represented the University of Kansas during the 1976–77 NCAA Division I men's basketball season.

== Roster ==
- John Douglas
- Herb Nobles
- Ken Koenigs
- Clint Johnson
- Donnie Von Moore
- Hasan Houston
- Paul Mokeski
- Milt Gibson
- Al Rhodeman
- Brad Sanders
- Chris Barnthouse
- Mac Stallcup
- Scott Anderson
- Dave Preston
- Tom Paget

== Schedule ==
Date time, TV	Rank^{#}	Opponent^{#}	Result	Record	Site city, state
November 27*		Montana State	W 104-47	1-0	Allen Fieldhouse; Lawrence, KS
December 1*		Murray State	W 81-66	2-0	Allen Fieldhouse; Lawrence, KS
December 4*		Central Missouri	W 74-52	3-0	Allen Fieldhouse; Lawrence, KS
December 6*		Oral Roberts	W 79-69	4-0	Allen Fieldhouse; Lawrence, KS
December 9*		at Fordham	W 57-48	5-0	Rose Hill Gymnasium; New York, NY
December 11*		at No. 4 Kentucky	L 63-90	5-1	Rupp Arena; Lexington, KY
December 17*		Minnesota State	W 87-74	6-1	Allen Fieldhouse; Lawrence, KS
December 18*		No. 19 Arkansas	L 63-67	6-2	Allen Fieldhouse; Lawrence, KS
December 20*		at Saint Louis	W 69-68	7-2	Kiel Auditorium; St. Louis, MO
December 27		vs. Oklahoma	W 74-70 ^{OT}	8-2	Kemper Arena; Kansas City, MO
December 29		vs. Kansas State; Sunflower Showdown	W 81-64	9-2	Kemper Arena; Kansas City, MO
December 30		vs. Missouri; Border War	L 65-69	9-3	Kemper Arena; Kansas City, MO
January 8		Missouri; Border War	W 77-72	10-3 (1-0)	Allen Fieldhouse; Lawrence, KS
January 12		Oklahoma State	W 62-60	11-3 (2-0)	Allen Fieldhouse; Lawrence, KS
January 15		at Oklahoma	L 67-71	11-4 (2-1)	Lloyd Noble Center; Norman, OK
January 18		Iowa State	W 73-62	12-4 (3-1)	Allen Fieldhouse; Lawrence, KS
January 22		at Kansas State; Sunflower Showdown	L 65-80	12-5 (3-2)	Ahearn Field House; Manhattan, KS
January 26		at Nebraska	L 57-60	12-6 (3-3)	Bob Devaney Sports Center; Lincoln, NE
January 29		Colorado	W 79-70	13-6 (4-3)	Allen Fieldhouse; Lawrence, KS
February 2		at Oklahoma State	W 60-58	14-6 (5-3)	Gallagher-Iba Arena; Stillwater, OK
February 5		Oklahoma	W 91-81	15-6 (6-3)	Allen Fieldhouse; Lawrence, KS
February 9		at Missouri; Border War	L 79-87	15-7 (6-4)	Hearnes Center; Columbia, MO
February 12		Kansas State; Sunflower Showdown	L 83-86	15-8 (6-5)	Allen Fieldhouse; Lawrence, KS
February 16		at Iowa State	W 91-89	16-8 (7-5)	James H. Hilton Coliseum; Ames, IA
February 19		Nebraska	W 74-66	17-8 (8-5)	Allen Fieldhouse; Lawrence, KS
February 23		at Colorado	L 49-58	17-9 (8-6)	Balch Fieldhouse; Boulder, CO
February 26		Nebraska; Big Eight Conference men's basketball tournament quarterfinals	W 61-58	18-9	Allen Fieldhouse; Lawrence, KS
March 3		vs. Kansas State; Big Eight Conference men's basketball tournament semifinals Sunflower Showdown	L 67-80	18-10	Kemper Arena; Kansas City, MO
*Non-conference game. ^{#}Rankings from AP Poll. (#) Tournament seedings in parentheses.
