= Lynn Nance =

American basketball player-coach

Biographical details
- Born: September 3, 1942 (age 84); Granby, Missouri, U.S.

Playing career
- 1961–1963: Southwest Baptist
- 1963–1965: Washington

Coaching career (HC unless noted)
- 1966–1967: Versailles (MO)
- 1967–1968: Washington (JV)
- 1968–1970: Washington (asst.)
- 1974–1976: Kentucky (asst.)
- 1976–1980: Iowa State
- 1980–1985: Central Missouri State
- 1985–1986: Fresno State (asst.)
- 1986–1989: Saint Mary's
- 1989–1993: Washington
- 1996–1999: Southwest Baptist
- 2010–2011: LSU (asst.)

Head coaching record
- Overall: 302–224 (.574)

Accomplishments and honors

Championships
- NCAA Division II national (1984); WCC regular season (1989)

Awards
- As player: 2× Junior College All-American (1962, 1963); As coach: Division II Coach of the Year (1984); WCC Coach of the Year (1989)

Lynn Sanford Nance (born September 3, 1942) is an American former college basketball coach. He also served as head coach at Iowa State, Central Missouri State, Saint Mary's, Washington, and Southwest Baptist.

== Early life and education ==
Nance was born in Granby, Missouri, where he graduated from Granby High School in 1960. A 6-foot-5 center, he averaged 26 points and 21 rebounds a game as a senior.

At Southwest Baptist Junior College (now University), Nance was a junior college All-American player before transferring to the University of Washington, where he became an honorable mention all-American. Nance went on to be selected in the fourth round of the 1965 NBA draft by the St. Louis Hawks. Unfortunately, a knee injury ended his professional career before he ever played a game for St. Louis.

== Coaching career ==
Nance began his coaching career as head basketball coach at Versailles High School in Versailles, Missouri. He was freshman team coach at Washington in 1967–68. From 1968 to 1970, Nance was assistant varsity coach at Washington under Tex Winter before leaving to join the FBI.

In 1974, Nance returned to coaching basketball as an assistant on Joe B. Hall's staff at Kentucky for two seasons.

From 1976 to 1980, Nance was head coach at Iowa State, during which Nance went 41–59. Following an 8–10 start to the season, Nance resigned from Iowa State on January 29, 1980. Iowa State settled to buy out the remaining two years on his contract, worth around $36,000.

Nance's next job was at Central Missouri State (now Central Missouri), an Division II, where he was head coach from 1980 to 1985. Nance led Central Missouri State to a 29–3 record and national championship in the 1983–84 season.

Returning to the Division I level, Nance was an assistant coach at Fresno State in 1985–86. Nance again worked as a head coach from 1986 to 1989 at Saint Mary's College, going 61–27 with a school record 25 wins, West Coast Athletic Conference title, and NCAA tournament appearance in 1988–89.

Nance's final two head coaching jobs were at schools where he played college basketball. From 1989 to 1993, Nance was head coach at Washington, going 50–62. From 1996 to 1999, Nance was head coach at Southwest Baptist, going 36–42.

In 2010, Nance returned to coaching to serve as an assistant under Trent Johnson at LSU.

== Outside of coaching ==
Aside from his career as a coach, Nance also served as a special agent for the FBI from 1970 to 1973. From 1973 to 1974, Nance was an investigator for the NCAA. Nance drew upon his experience as an FBI agent to write a novel titled Bridger: Deadly Peril.

In 1989, Nance spoke negatively about his former job as an NCAA investigator and said that NCAA rules "don’t take into consideration that some players’ parents don't have money."

== Head coaching record ==
Record table
Season	Team	Overall	Conference	Standing	Postseason
Iowa State Cyclones (Big Eight Conference) (1976–1980)
1976–77	Iowa State	8–19*	4–10*	8th*	
1977–78	Iowa State	14–13	9–5	2nd	
1978–79	Iowa State	11–16	6–8	6th	
1979–80	Iowa State	8–10**	2–3**	(resigned)	
Iowa State:		40–59 (.404)	21–26 (.447)		
Central Missouri State Mules (Missouri Intercollegiate Athletic Association) (1980–1985)
1980–81	Central Missouri State	20–9	11–3	T–1st	NCAA Division II Regional Fourth Place
1981–82	Central Missouri State	20–9	8–4	T–2nd	NCAA Division II Regional Third Place
1982–83	Central Missouri State	23–7	9–3	2nd	NCAA Division II regional final
1983–84	Central Missouri State	29–3	11–1	1st	NCAA Division II Champions
1984–85	Central Missouri State	22–7	9–3	T–1st	NCAA Division II Regional Third Place
Central Missouri State:		114–35 (.765)	48–14 (.774)		
Saint Mary's Gaels (West Coast Athletic Conference) (1986–1989)
1986–87	Saint Mary's	17–13	7–7	3rd	
1987–88	Saint Mary's	19–9	9–5	2nd	
1988–89	Saint Mary's	25–5	12–2	1st	NCAA Division I first round
Saint Mary's:		61–27 (.693)	28–14 (.667)		
Washington Huskies (Pacific-10 Conference) (1989–1993)
1989–90	Washington	11–17	5–13	9th	
1990–91	Washington	14–14	5–13	10th	
1991–92	Washington	12–17	5–13	8th	
1992–93	Washington	13–14	7–11	8th	
Washington:		50–62 (.446)	22–50 (.306)		
Southwest Baptist Bearcats (Mid-America Intercollegiate Athletics Association) (1996–1999)
1996–97	Southwest Baptist	11–14	5–13	10th	
1997–98	Southwest Baptist	13–14	6–10	T–8th	
1998–99	Southwest Baptist	12–14	5–11	9th	
Southwest Baptist:		36–42 (.462)	16–34 (.320)		
Total:		302–224 (.574)			
National champion Postseason invitational champion Conference regular season champion Conference regular season and conference tournament champion Division regular season champion Division regular season and conference tournament champion Conference tournament champion

(*) ISU finished the season 7–20, but was later awarded a win vacated by Oklahoma State.
(**) Indicates record/standing at time of resignation from Iowa State.
