= Dean Uthoff =

American-Australian basketball player (born 1958)

Personal information
- Born: July 7, 1958 (age 68) Cedar Rapids, Iowa, U.S.
- Listed height: 6 ft 11 in (2.11 m)
- Listed weight: 250 lb (113 kg)

Career information
- High school: Jefferson (Cedar Rapids, Iowa)
- College: Iowa State (1976–1980)
- NBA draft: 1980: 6th round, 129th overall pick
- Drafted by: San Antonio Spurs
- Playing career: 1983–1996
- Position: Center

Career history
- 1983–1985: Nunawading Spectres
- 1986–1987: Dandenong Rangers
- 1988–1991: Eastside Spectres
- 1992–1996: Sydney Kings

Career highlights
- 2× All-NBL Second Team (1988, 1989); First-team All-Big Eight (1978)
- Stats at Basketball Reference

Dean Allen Uthoff (born July 7, 1958) is an American-Australian former professional basketball player. He played college basketball for the Iowa State Cyclones. Uthoff spent his entire professional career in Australia where he played for the Nunawading / Eastside Spectres and Sydney Kings of the National Basketball League (NBL). Nicknamed the "Man Mountain", he was a prolific rebounder and holds NBL records for most rebounds in a game with 34 and the highest rebounding season average with 18.5 per game.

== High school career ==
Uthoff played basketball at Jefferson High School in his hometown of Cedar Rapids, Iowa. His career totals of 1,010 points and 919 rebounds are school records. On April 19, 1976, Uthoff signed to play college basketball for the Iowa State Cyclones.

== College career ==
Uthoff averaged a team-high 11.5 points and 11.3 rebounds per game during his freshman season with the Iowa State Cyclones in 1976–77. Head coach Lynn Nance described him as "the best freshman center in the country this year" while sportswriter Bob Hersom of The Gazette considered Uthoff to have "enjoyed the greatest freshman season in Cyclone basketball history."

Uthoff was selected to the All-Big Eight Conference first-team in 1978. He led the Big Eight in rebounding all four seasons he played. Uthoff is the all-time leading rebounder for Iowa State and the Big Eight Conference with 1,233 career rebounds.

Uthoff was inducted into the Iowa State Athletics Hall of Fame in 2022.

== Professional career ==
Uthoff attended training camp with the San Antonio Spurs in 1980 but did not make the team. He returned to the Spurs for preseason camp in 1981. On October 31, Uthoff was waived by the Spurs after he appeared in four exhibition games. He had considered his basketball career over when he was contacted by the parents of his Iowa State teammate Chuck Harmison who encouraged him to play in Australia. Harmison had played for the Nunawading Spectres of the National Basketball League (NBL) in 1982 and Uthoff decided to join after talking to team officials.

Uthoff joined the Spectres in 1983 where he played alongside two fellow Iowans in Harmison and Ron Lemons. He ranked second in the league for total rebounds during his first season. After two successful seasons with the Spectres, Uthoff suffered a slipped disc and was kept from playing for a year. He tried to return in 1986 but was still troubled by the injury and released by the Spectres. Uthoff spent the next two seasons with the Dandenong Rangers in the South East Australian Basketball League (SEABL).

After Uthoff originally signed to play for the North Melbourne Giants, he reneged and returned to the renamed Eastside Spectres in 1988. He finished third in voting for the NBL Most Valuable Player Award and was named to the All-NBL Second Team in 1989. Uthoff led the Spectres to the NBL Grand Final in 1991.

On November 21, 1991, Uthoff signed with the Sydney Kings. He retired in 1995 but returned to the Kings in 1996 as a replacement for the injured Justin Withers.

Uthoff led the NBL in rebounding for three seasons. He averaged 18.5 rebounds per game during the 1984 season which is an NBL record. Uthoff also holds the NBL record for most rebounds in a game with 34. He was described as "perhaps the best" rebounder to ever play in the NBL. Uthoff was nicknamed the "Man Mountain" during his NBL career.

== Personal life ==
Uthoff became a naturalized Australian citizen in 1987. He met his wife, Sylvia, when he first moved to Australia. Uthoff and Sylvia have a son.

Uthoff is related to basketball player Jarrod Uthoff.
