= Chuck Harmison =

Australian professional basketball player

Personal information
- Born: February 24, 1958 (age 68) Iowa, U.S.
- Listed height: 6 ft 9 in (2.06 m)

Career information
- High school: Ames (Ames, Iowa)
- College: Iowa State (1976–1980)
- NBA draft: 1980: undrafted
- Playing career: 1982–1996
- Position: Power forward / center

Career history
- 1982–1983: Nunawading Spectres
- 1984–1985: Coburg Giants
- 1986–1987: West Sydney Westars
- 1988–1996: Illawarra Hawks

Career highlights
- No. 4 retired by Illawarra Hawks

Charles Robert Harmison (born February 24, 1958) is an American-Australian former professional basketball player who played 15 seasons in the Australian National Basketball League (NBL). He played college basketball for the Iowa State Cyclones between 1976 and 1980. He moved to Australia in 1982 to play for the Nunawading Spectres and later played for the Coburg Giants and West Sydney Westars before playing nine seasons with the Illawarra Hawks between 1988 and 1996. His No. 4 jersey was retired by the Illawarra Hawks. After retiring, Harmison entered sports administration, where he served as general manager of both the Hawks and the NBL.

== Early life ==
Harmison was born in the U.S. state of Iowa. He is a native of Ames, Iowa. He attended Ames High School and led the basketball team to an undefeated state championship season in 1976. He was one of the most coveted recruits in the nation coming out of high school.

== College career ==
Harmison chose to remain in Ames for college, where he attended Iowa State University. He played four seasons of college basketball for the Cyclones between 1976 and 1980.

As a freshman in 1976–77, Harmison averaged 6.8 points and 5.4 rebounds in 26 games. As a sophomore in 1977–78, he averaged 6.7 points and 5.3 rebounds in 27 games. As a junior in 1978–79, he averaged 7.0 points and 5.8 rebounds in 24 games. He had a career-best season as a senior in 1979–80, averaging 12.5 points, 6.4 rebounds and 1.8 assists in 27 games.

== Professional career ==
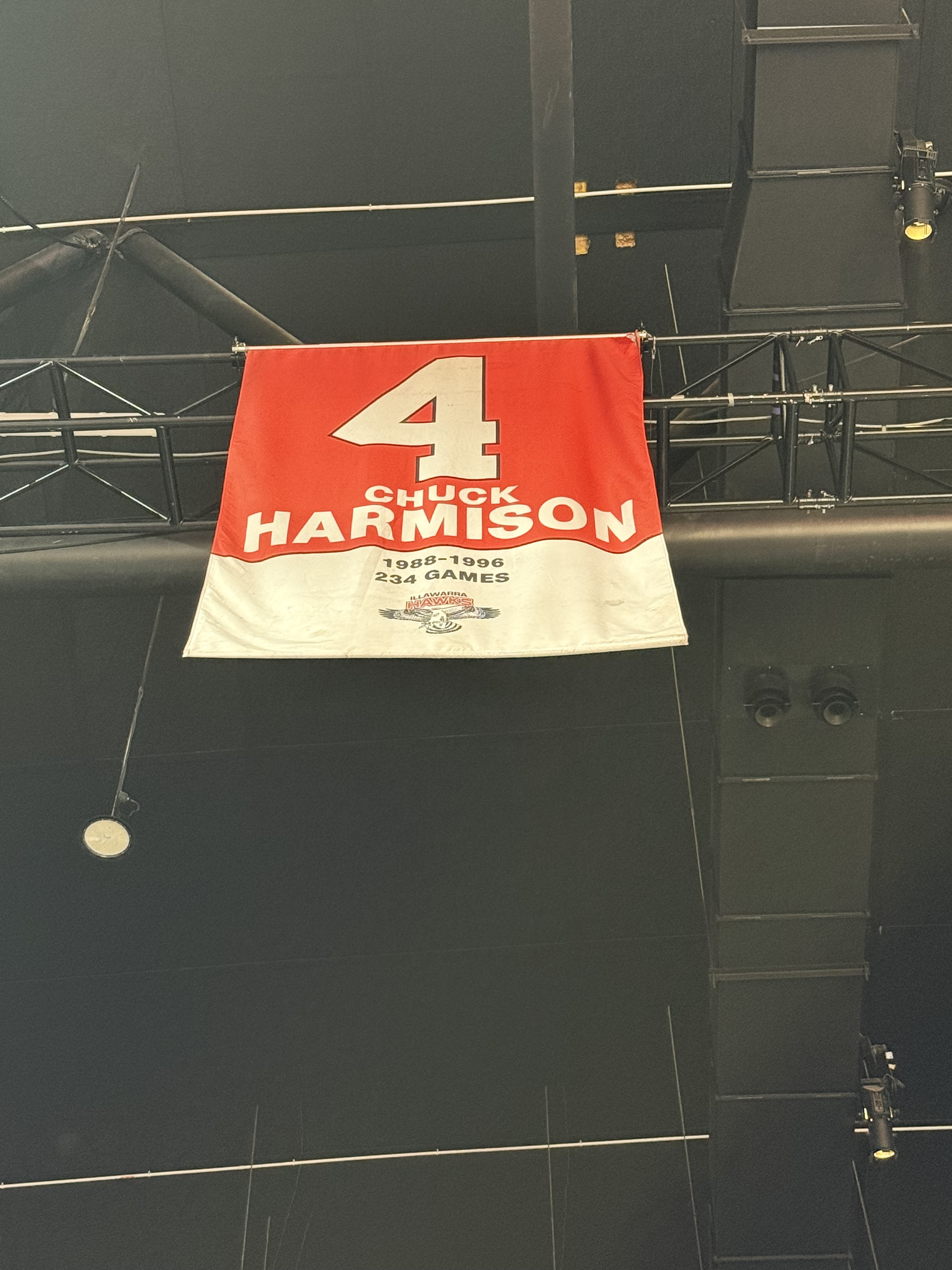
Harmison's retired jersey number hanging at WIN Entertainment Centre, December 2025

After graduating college, Harmison had a season in Belgium before moving to Australia in 1982 to play for the Nunawading Spectres of the National Basketball League (NBL). He played two seasons for the Spectres and then played two seasons for the Coburg Giants and West Sydney Westars before joining the Illawarra Hawks for the 1988 season. He joined the Hawks as a naturalised Australian. He played nine seasons for the Hawks and served as team captain from 1989 to 1996. He retired at age 38 following the 1996 season. He finished his NBL career with 15 seasons and 386 games. He held the all-time games played record for the Hawks at 234, before being passed by Melvin Thomas in the mid 2000s.

Harmison's No. 4 jersey was retired by the Illawarra Hawks in 2008, and he was named a Hawks life member.

== Front office career ==
After retiring from playing, the Illawarra Hawks moved Harmison into the front office and appointed him the general manager of the team, a position he held for seven years. During his tenure, the club was renamed the Wollongong Hawks and the team won the NBL championship in 2001.

On 1 October 2004, Harmison was appointed the general manager of the NBL. He was still in the position of NBL general manager as of 2011 and by 2013 he had transitioned into Basketball Australia's professional leagues operations manager, overseeing both the NBL and WNBL.

== Personal life ==
As of 2011, Harmison was still living in Wollongong. As of 2022, Harmison's son, Mitch Harmison, was an MMA fighter.
