= 1913–14 NCAA men's basketball season =

Men's collegiate basketball season

- Helms National Champions: Wisconsin (retroactive selection in 1943)
- Player of the Year (Helms): Gil Halstead, Cornell (retroactive selection in 1944)

The 1913–14 NCAA men's basketball season began in December 1913, progressed through the regular season, and concluded in March 1914.

== Rule changes ==
Baskets with open bottoms that allow the ball to fall through become mandatory. Previously, baskets had closed bottoms, requiring the pulling of a rope to release the ball after a field goal or successful free throw. The switch to open-bottomed baskets increased the tempo of play and scoring.

== Season headlines ==
- In February 1943, the Helms Athletic Foundation retroactively selected Wisconsin as its national champion for the 1913–14 season.
- In 1995, the Premo-Porretta Power Poll retroactively selected Wisconsin as its top-ranked team for the 1913–14 season.

== Regular season ==
=== Conferences ===
==== Conference winners ====
Conference	Regular Season Winner	Conference Player of the Year	Conference Tournament	Tournament Venue (City)	Tournament Winner
Eastern Intercollegiate Basketball League	Columbia & Cornell	None selected	No Tournament		
Missouri Valley Intercollegiate Athletic Association	Nebraska (North) & Kansas (South)	None selected	No Tournament		
Rocky Mountain Athletic Conference	Colorado		No Tournament		
Western Conference	Wisconsin	None selected	No Tournament		

==== Conference standings ====
1913–14 Eastern Intercollegiate Basketball League standings
	Conf.				Overall
Team	W		L	PCT	W		L	PCT
Cornell	8	–	2	.800	14	–	2	.875
Columbia	8	–	2	.800	9	–	3	.750
Yale	6	–	4	.600	11	–	7	.611
Princeton	5	–	5	.500	12	–	6	.667
Penn	2	–	8	.200	4	–	12	.250
Dartmouth	1	–	9	.100	4	–	13	.235

1913–14 Rocky Mountain Conference standings
	Conf.				Overall
Team	W		L	PCT	W		L	PCT
Colorado	5	–	1	.833	5	–	3	.625
Colorado Agricultural	3	–	3	.500	5	–	3	.625
Colorado Mines	2	–	4	.333	2	–	4	.333
Denver	2	–	4	.333	2	–	4	.333

1913–14 Missouri Valley Intercollegiate Athletic Association men's basketball standings
	Conf.				Overall
Team	W		L	PCT	W		L	PCT
North Division
Nebraska	7	–	0	1.000	15	–	3	.833
Iowa State	4	–	10	.286	4	–	14	.222
Drake	0	–	5	.000	1	–	9	.100
South Division
Kansas	13	–	1	.929	17	–	1	.944
Kansas State	7	–	5	.583	10	–	7	.588
Washington University	4	–	6	.400	7	–	6	.538
Missouri	4	–	12	.250	4	–	12	.250

1913–14 Western Conference men's basketball standings
	Conf.				Overall
Team	W		L	PCT	W		L	PCT
Wisconsin	12	–	0	1.000	15	–	0	1.000
Ohio State	5	–	1	.833	11	–	4	.733
Chicago	8	–	4	.667	19	–	9	.679
Illinois	7	–	3	.700	9	–	4	.692
Northwestern	5	–	5	.500	11	–	6	.647
Minnesota	4	–	8	.333	4	–	11	.267
Purdue	3	–	9	.250	5	–	9	.357
Iowa	1	–	5	.167	9	–	7	.563
Indiana	1	–	11	.083	2	–	12	.143

=== Independents ===
A total of 124 college teams played as major independents. Among independents that played at least 10 games, Navy (10–0), Syracuse (12–0), and Texas (11–0) were undefeated, and Fordham (20–8) finished with the most wins.

1913–14 NCAA men's basketball independents standings
	Conf.				Overall
Team	W		L	PCT	W		L	PCT
California		–		–	2	–	0	1.000
Navy		–		–	10	–	0	1.000
Syracuse		–		–	12	–	0	1.000
Texas		–		–	11	–	0	1.000
Denison		–		–	15	–	1	.938
Virginia		–		–	12	–	1	.923
Grinnell		–		–	10	–	1	.909
Nebraska Wesleyan		–		–	19	–	2	.905
Georgia		–		–	9	–	1	.900
Saint Mary's (Calif.)		–		–	16	–	2	.889
Washington College		–		–	8	–	1	.889
Tennessee		–		–	15	–	2	.882
Oklahoma		–		–	7	–	1	.875
Rochester (N.Y.)		–		–	14	–	2	.875
Mississippi A&M		–		–	13	–	2	.867
Utah		–		–	13	–	2	.867
Kentucky		–		–	12	–	2	.857
Lehigh		–		–	12	–	2	.857
North Dakota Agricultural		–		–	12	–	2	.857
The Citadel		–		–	6	–	1	.857
Washington		–		–	12	–	2	.857
Richmond		–		–	5	–	1	.833
Seton Hall		–		–	14	–	3	.824
Brigham Young		–		–	8	–	2	.800
Central Missouri		–		–	15	–	4	.789
Union (N.Y.)		–		–	11	–	3	.786
Arizona		–		–	7	–	2	.778
Duquesne		–		–	7	–	2	.778
Kent State		–		–	7	–	2	.778
Catholic		–		–	13	–	4	.765
Millikin		–		–	12	–	4	.750
Virginia Tech		–		–	14	–	5	.737
Indiana State		–		–	11	–	4	.733
Kalamazoo		–		–	8	–	3	.727
Roanoke		–		–	13	–	5	.722
Fordham		–		–	20	–	8	.714
Swarthmore		–		–	10	–	4	.714
Texas A&M		–		–	5	–	2	.714
Utah State		–		–	10	–	4	.714
Nevada		–		–	7	–	3	.700
Oberlin		–		–	7	–	3	.700
Washington & Jefferson		–		–	7	–	3	.700
Niagara		–		–	9	–	4	.692
Idaho		–		–	11	–	5	.688
Notre Dame		–		–	11	–	5	.688
Wabash		–		–	11	–	5	.688
Carleton		–		–	10	–	5	.667
Detroit		–		–	6	–	3	.667
Michigan State		–		–	8	–	4	.667
Montana State		–		–	10	–	5	.667
Penn State		–		–	8	–	4	.667
St. Joseph's		–		–	10	–	5	.667
Tulane		–		–	8	–	4	.667
Vanderbilt		–		–	6	–	3	.667
Manhattan		–		–	11	–	6	.647
Augustana (Ill.)		–		–	9	–	5	.643
Canisius		–		–	5	–	3	.625
Georgetown		–		–	10	–	6	.625
Allegheny		–		–	8	–	5	.615
Lake Forest		–		–	8	–	5	.615
Grove City		–		–	11	–	7	.611
Alabama		–		–	6	–	4	.600
Rutgers		–		–	3	–	2	.600
Tulsa		–		–	3	–	2	.600
North Dakota		–		–	10	–	7	.588
Wake Forest		–		–	10	–	7	.588
Beloit		–		–	7	–	5	.583
Louisiana State		–		–	7	–	5	.583
Stanford		–		–	7	–	5	.583
Washington and Lee		–		–	7	–	5	.583
Trinity (N.C.)		–		–	12	–	9	.571
Washington State		–		–	13	–	10	.565
Dayton		–		–	5	–	4	.556
North Carolina		–		–	10	–	8	.556
Oregon Agricultural		–		–	10	–	8	.556
South Carolina		–		–	5	–	4	.556
Tempe Normal		–		–	6	–	5	.545
CCNY		–		–	6	–	5	.545
Mount Union		–		–	6	–	5	.545
Miami (Ohio)		–		–	7	–	6	.538
Southwestern (Kan.)		–		–	7	–	6	.538
Ole Miss		–		–	8	–	7	.533
Fairmount		–		–	8	–	7	.533
Akron		–		–	6	–	6	.500
Bradley		–		–	10	–	10	.500
Gettysburg		–		–	9	–	9	.500
Springfield (Mass.)		–		–	6	–	6	.500
Washburn		–		–	8	–	8	.500
Western State Normal		–		–	4	–	4	.500
Wisconsin–Stevens Point		–		–	7	–	7	.500
Pittsburgh		–		–	7	–	8	.467
North Carolina State		–		–	6	–	7	.462
Franklin		–		–	6	–	8	.429
Army		–		–	5	–	7	.417
Lafayette		–		–	5	–	7	.417
Loyola (Md.)		–		–	5	–	7	.417
Southern California		–		–	5	–	7	.417
Temple		–		–	5	–	7	.417
New York University		–		–	6	–	9	.400
St. Lawrence		–		–	6	–	9	.400
St. John's (N.Y.)		–		–	7	–	11	.389
VMI		–		–	4	–	7	.364
Oregon		–		–	6	–	11	.353
Bucknell		–		–	4	–	8	.333
Delaware		–		–	3	–	6	.333
Marietta		–		–	4	–	8	.333
Northern Colorado		–		–	1	–	2	.333
Santa Clara		–		–	2	–	4	.333
William & Mary		–		–	3	–	6	.333
Muhlenberg		–		–	4	–	10	.286
Clemson		–		–	1	–	3	.250
Louisville		–		–	2	–	6	.250
Wyoming		–		–	1	–	3	.250
Auburn		–		–	3	–	10	.231
Ohio		–		–	3	–	10	.231
George Washington		–		–	3	–	11	.214
Cincinnati		–		–	2	–	8	.200
Colgate		–		–	3	–	12	.200
Montana		–		–	2	–	9	.182
TCU		–		–	2	–	9	.182
Baylor		–		–	1	–	8	.111
Millsaps		–		–	0	–	8	.000
New Mexico		–		–	0	–	1	.000
Wooster		–		–	0	–	13	.000

== Awards ==
=== Helms College Basketball All-Americans ===
The practice of selecting a Consensus All-American Team did not begin until the 1928–29 season. The Helms Athletic Foundation later retroactively selected a list of All-Americans for the 1913–14 season.

Player	Team
Lewis Castle	Syracuse
Gil Halstead	Cornell
Carl Harper	Wisconsin
Ernest Houghton	Union (NY)
Walter Lunden	Cornell
Daniel Meenan	Columbia
Nelson Norgren	Chicago
Elmer Oliphant	Purdue
Everett Southwick	CCNY
Eugene Van Gent	Wisconsin

=== Major player of the year awards ===
- Helms Player of the Year: Gil Halstead, Cornell (retroactive selection in 1944)

== Coaching changes ==
A number of teams changed coaches during the season and after it ended.

Team	Former Coach	Interim Coach	New Coach	Reason
Arizona	Raymond L. Quigley		Pop McKale	
Tempe Normal	G. W. Henry		George Schaeffler	
Army	Joseph Stilwell		Jacob L. Devers	
Baylor	Norman C. Paine		Charles Mosley	
Bucknell	Dwite Shaffner		Gorge Cockill	
Cincinnati	Russ Easton		George Little	
The Citadel	Darl Buse		Hans Kangster	
Dartmouth	C. A. Reed		P. W. Loudon	
Dayton	Harry Solimano		Al Mahrt	
Denver	Hiram Wilson		Charles Wingender	
Drake	John L. Griffin		Ry Whisman	
Duquesne	Alexander Hogarty		Eugene McGuigan	
Fairmount	Willis Bates		Harry Buck	
Fordham	Clement Risacher		Alcott Neary	
George Washington	George Schlosser		Nathan Dougherty	
Georgetown	James Colliflower		John O'Reilly	After three years as a part-time coach, Colliflower departed after the season to devote himself full-time to his business interests. Georgetown hired O'Reilly as a full-time coach for the following season.
Kansas State	Guy Lowman		Carl J. Merner	
Miami (OH)	A. D. Browne		Howard Flack	
Missouri	Osmond F. Field		Eugene Van Gent	
Montana	W. H. Mustaine		Jerry Nissen	
Navy	Laurence Wild		Albert Cohan	
NC State	Jack Hegarty		H. S. Tucker	
North Carolina	Nathaniel Cartmell		Charles Doak	
North Dakota	Fred V. Archer		Thomas Andrew Gill	
Northwestern	Dennis Grady		Fred J. Murphy	
Penn	Arthur Kiefaber		Lon Jourdet	
Rutgers	Dave Armstrong		George Davidson	
Saint Mary's (Calif.)	Otto Rittler		Fred Broderick	
South Carolina	John Blackburn		L. W. Hill	
St. John's	Claude Allen		Joseph O'Shea	
Tulane	Carl Henson		Edwin Sweetland	
Tulsa	Harvey L. Allen		Forest Rees	
Utah	Fred Bennion		Nelson Norgren	
Utah State	Clayton Teetzel		Joseph Jensen	
VMI	W. C. Raffery		Frank Gorton	
Yale	Haskell Noyes		Robert G. Stowe	
