= 1913–14 Iowa State Cyclones men's basketball team =

American college basketball season

1913–14 Iowa State Cyclones men's basketball
- Conference: Missouri Valley Intercollegiate Athletic Association
- Record: 4–14 (4–10 MVIAA)
- Head coach: Homer Hubbard (3rd season)
- Home arena: State Gymnasium

1913–14 Missouri Valley Intercollegiate Athletic Association men's basketball standings
	Conf.				Overall
Team	W		L	PCT	W		L	PCT
North Division
Nebraska	7	–	0	1.000	15	–	3	.833
Iowa State	4	–	10	.286	4	–	14	.222
Drake	0	–	5	.000	1	–	9	.100
South Division
Kansas	13	–	1	.929	17	–	1	.944
Kansas State	7	–	5	.583	10	–	7	.588
Washington University	4	–	6	.400	7	–	6	.538
Missouri	4	–	12	.250	4	–	12	.250

The 1913–14 Iowa State Cyclones men's basketball team (also known informally as Ames) represented Iowa State University during the 1913–14 NCAA men's basketball season. The Cyclones were coached by Homer Hubbard, who was in his third season with the Cyclones. They played their home games at the State Gymnasium in Ames, Iowa.

They finished the season 4–14, 4–10 in Missouri Valley play to finish in second place in the North division.

== Roster ==
1913–14 Iowa State Cyclones men's basketball team
Players
Coaches

Pos.	#	Name	Height	Weight	Year	Hometown
F		Dowell	—	—		Bedford, Iowa
G		Harry Hansel (C)	—	—
G		Harpel	—	—
C		Earl A. Holmes	—	—		Sioux City, Iowa
C		Noble	—	—
G		Kelly	—	—
F		Porterfield	—	—		Waterloo, Iowa
F		Rath	—	—
F		Rodgers	—	—
F		J.D. "Chick" Swiney	—	—		Davenport, Iowa
F		"Herc" Wermhoudt	—	—		Ottumwa, Iowa

Head coach

- Homer Hubbard

Assistant coach(es)

Legend

- (C) Team captain
- (S) Suspended
- (I) Ineligible
- (W) Walk-on
- Injured
- Current redshirt

== Schedule and results ==
Date time, TV	Rank^{#}	Opponent^{#}	Result	Record	Site city, state
Regular season
January 7, 1914		at Kansas	L 18–24	0–1 (0–1)	Robinson Gymnasium; Lawrence, Kansas
January 8, 1914		at Kansas	L 22–38	0–2 (0–2)	Robinson Gymnasium; Lawrence, Kansas
January 9, 1914		at Kansas State	L 7–19	0–3 (0–3)	Nichols Hall; Manhattan, Kansas
January 10, 1914		at Kansas State	W 17–14	1–3 (1–3)	Nichols Hall; Manhattan, Kansas
January 12, 1914		at Missouri	L 19–32	1–4 (1–4)	Rothwell Gymnasium; Columbia, Missouri
January 13, 1914		at Missouri	L 9–37	1–5 (1–5)	Rothwell Gymnasium; Columbia, Missouri
January 24, 1914		at Drake; Iowa Big Four	W 15–11	2–5 (2–5)	State Gymnasium; Ames, Iowa
January 30, 1914*		at Grinnell	L 19–25	2–6	Grinnell, Iowa
January 31, 1914*		at Iowa; Cy-Hawk Rivalry	L 15–22	2–7	First Iowa Armory; Iowa City, Iowa
February 6, 1914*; 8:00 pm		Grinnell	L 18–25	2–8	State Gymnasium; Ames, Iowa
February 10, 1914		at Drake; Iowa Big Four	W 33–7	3–8 (3–5)	Alumni Gymnasium; Des Moines, Iowa
February 13, 1914		Missouri	W 24–21	4–8 (4–5)	State Gymnasium; Ames, Iowa
February 14, 1914		Missouri	L 16–23	4–9 (4–6)	State Gymnasium; Ames, Iowa
February 20, 1914		Nebraska	L 9–15	4–10 (4–7)	State Gymnasium; Ames, Iowa
February 21, 1914		Nebraska	L 3–16	4–11 (4–8)	State Gymnasium; Ames, Iowa
February 24, 1914*		Iowa; Cy-Hawk Rivalry	L 16–21	4–12	State Gymnasium; Ames, Iowa
February 27, 1914		at Nebraska	L 16–24	4–13 (4–9)	Grant Memorial Hall; Lincoln, Nebraska
February 28, 1914		at Nebraska	L 13–41	4–14 (4–10)	Grant Memorial Hall; Lincoln, Nebraska
*Non-conference game. ^{#}Rankings from AP poll. (#) Tournament seedings in parentheses. All times are in Central Time.
