= 1913–14 Kansas Jayhawks men's basketball team =

American college basketball season

1913–14 Kansas Jayhawks men's basketball

MVIAA Co-Champions
- Conference: MVIAA
- Record: 17–1 (13–1 MVIAA)
- Head coach: W.O. Hamilton (5th season)
- Captain: Ralph Sproull
- Home arena: Robinson Gymnasium

The 1913–14 Kansas Jayhawks men's basketball team represented the University of Kansas during the 1913–14 college men's basketball season which was their 16th season. The Jayhawks, members of the MVIAA, were coached by W.O. Hamilton in his fifth year as coach and played their home games at Robinson Gymnasium. The Jayhawks finished the season 17–1 and were MVIAA Champions, their sixth conference championship. On February 19, 1914, the Jayhawks defeated Warrensburg (now known as Central Missouri) who were coached former Jayhawk basketball player and future long-time Kansas head coach Phog Allen in what was the first of two games Allen coached against his alma mater.

== Roster ==
- Lawrence Cole
- Ray Dunmire
- Ray Folks
- Charles Greenless
- Ralph Sproull
- Edward Van der Vries
- Arthur Weaver
- William D. Weidlein

== Schedule and results ==
Date time, TV	Rank^{#}	Opponent^{#}	Result	Record	Site city, state
January 7		Iowa State	W 24–18	1-0 (1-0)	Robinson Gymnasium; Lawrence, KS
January 8		Iowa State	W 38–22	2-0 (2-0)	Robinson Gymnasium; Lawrence, KS
January 12*		Haskell Indian Nations	W 49–28	3-0	Robinson Gymnasium; Lawrence, KS
January 16*		Washburn	W 39–28	4-0	Robinson Gymnasium; Lawrence, KS
January 22		at Kansas State; Sunflower Showdown	W 44–26	5-0 (3-0)	Nichols Hall; Manhattan, KS
January 23		at Kansas State; Sunflower Showdown	L 25–29	5-1 (3-1)	Nichols Hall; Manhattan, KS
January 30		Kansas State; Sunflower Showdown	W 28–24	6-1 (4-1)	Robinson Gymnasium; Lawrence, KS
January 31		Kansas State; Sunflower Showdown	W 41–16	7-1 (5-1)	Robinson Gymnasium; Lawrence, KS
February 6		Washington University (MO)	W 50–19	8-1 (6-1)	Robinson Gymnasium; Lawrence, KS
February 7		Washington University (MO)	W 41–11	9-1 (7-1)	Robinson Gymnasium; Lawrence, KS
February 11		at Missouri; Border War	W 28–25	10-1 (8-1)	Rothwell Gymnasium; Columbia, MO
February 12		at Missouri; Border War	W 27–21	11-1 (9-1)	Rothwell Gymnasium; Columbia, MO
February 13		at Washington University (MO)	W 29–18	12-1 (10-1)	Francis Gymnasium; St. Louis, MO
February 14		at Washington University (MO)	W 32–21	13-1 (11-1)	Francis Gymnasium; St. Louis, MO
February 19*		Warrensburg	W 49–22	14-1	Robinson Gymnasium; Lawrence, KS
February 25		Missouri; Border War	W 38–22	15-1 (12-1)	Robinson Gymnasium; Lawrence, KS
February 26		Missouri; Border War	W 31–18	16-1 (13-1)	Robinson Gymnasium; Lawrence, KS
February 28*		at College of Emporia	W 40–25	17-1	Emporia, KS
*Non-conference game. ^{#}Rankings from AP Poll. (#) Tournament seedings in parentheses.
