= Waldo Wegner =

American basketball player

Personal information
- Born: January 17, 1913 Everly, Iowa, U.S.
- Died: June 2, 2001 (aged 88) Ames, Iowa, U.S.
- Listed height: 6 ft 4 in (1.93 m)

Career information
- High school: Everly (Everly, Iowa)
- College: Iowa State (1932–1935)
- Position: Center
- Number: 14

Career highlights
- Third-team All-American – Converse (1935); 2× First-team All-Big Six (1934, 1935); No. 14 retired by Iowa State Cyclones

Waldo Wilbert Wegner (January 17, 1913 – June 2, 2001) was an American basketball player. Wegner was the first NCAA All-American in Iowa State basketball history. Standing 6'4", Wenger was a civil engineering student at Iowa State when he answered an advertisement in the college newspaper to try out for the team.

His basketball jersey, number 14, was retired in 1992. He was the fifth player in Iowa State Cyclones men's basketball history to have his number retired. He shares the number 14 with Jeff Hornacek whose jersey was retired the year prior. In 2007, he was named to the Cyclones' "all-century" basketball team. He was also a center fielder on the Iowa State baseball team.

After graduating in 1935, Wegner worked as a city engineer, director of public works, and city manager in several Iowa and Minnesota cities. He also served in the U.S. Navy from 1942 to 1945. In 1963, Wegner returned to Ames, Iowa to become the first director of the Center for Industrial Research and Service, appointed by then university President James H. Hilton, the namesake for Iowa State's basketball arena. Wegner held that position until he retired in 1978.

Waldo was a member of the Sigma chapter of Sigma Pi fraternity when he attended Iowa State University. He remained active in the fraternity late into his life. The formal room at the Sigma Chapter House is named in his honor. He was also a member of Tau Beta Pi engineering honorary society.
