= Jeff Grayer =

American basketball player (born 1965)

Personal information
- Born: December 17, 1965 (age 60) Flint, Michigan, U.S.
- Listed height: 6 ft 5 in (1.96 m)
- Listed weight: 200 lb (91 kg)

Career information
- High school: Flint Northwestern (Flint, Michigan)
- College: Iowa State (1984–1988)
- NBA draft: 1988: 1st round, 13th overall pick
- Drafted by: Milwaukee Bucks
- Playing career: 1988–1999
- Position: Small forward / shooting guard
- Number: 20, 44, 14

Career history
- 1988–1992: Milwaukee Bucks
- 1992–1994: Golden State Warriors
- 1995: Philadelphia 76ers
- 1995–1997: Rockford Lightning
- 1997: Sacramento Kings
- 1997–1998: Rockford Lightning
- 1998: Charlotte Hornets
- 1998: Golden State Warriors
- 1998–1999: Quad City Thunder

Career highlights
- Second-team All-American – AP (1988); Third-team All-American – UPI (1988); 3× First-team All-Big Eight (1986–1988); No. 44 retired by Iowa State Cyclones

Career NBA statistics
- Points: 3,257 (7.4 ppg)
- Rebounds: 1,294 (3.0 rpg)
- Stats at NBA.com
- Stats at Basketball Reference
Medals
Representing United States
Men's basketball
Bronze medal – third place	1988 Seoul	National team

Jeffrey Grayer (born December 17, 1965) is an American former professional basketball player who played nine seasons in the National Basketball Association (NBA). Grayer was an All-American college player for the Iowa State Cyclones and won an Olympic bronze medal as a member of the United States national team in 1988.

As a shooting guard, Grayer starred at Iowa State University from 1985 to 1988 where he set (and still holds) the all-time career scoring record, with 2,502 points. His senior year at Iowa State, his jersey number was retired. He was named 3-time all-Big Eight and All-American in 1988. Grayer was a member of the United States 1988 Olympic basketball team and was drafted by the Milwaukee Bucks in the first round (13th pick overall) of the 1988 NBA draft. The NBA journeyman played nine seasons in the league for five different teams.

In April 2010, Grayer was hired by Greg McDermott as an assistant men's basketball coach at Iowa State. In August 2010, after McDermott left to take a position at Creighton University he was replaced by new coach Fred Hoiberg. Hoiberg retained Grayer as Director of Basketball Operations rather than as an assistant coach, and Grayer left shortly after and returned to his home state of Michigan, citing a desire to be a coach as his reason for leaving.

Grayer is the father of professional basketball player Jaire Grayer.

== Business career ==
Following his professional basketball career, Grayer became an active entrepreneur and community leader in his hometown of Flint, Michigan. He founded Flint Athletes 4 Better Education (F.A.B.E.), a non-profit mentoring and educational program for youth. Since 2004, he has served as the Director of Business Development and a project manager for W.T. Stevens Construction, a family-owned firm.

== NBA career statistics ==
Legend
GP	Games played	GS	Games started	MPG	Minutes per game
FG%	Field goal percentage	3P%	3-point field goal percentage	FT%	Free throw percentage
RPG	Rebounds per game	APG	Assists per game	SPG	Steals per game
BPG	Blocks per game	PPG	Points per game	**Bold**	Career high
*	Led the league

=== Regular season ===
Year	Team	GP	GS	MPG	FG%	3P%	FT%	RPG	APG	SPG	BPG	PPG
1988–89	Milwaukee	11	2	18.2	.438	.000	**.850**	3.2	**2.0**	**0.9**	0.1	7.4
1989–90	Milwaukee	71	**40**	20.1	.460	.125	.651	3.1	1.5	0.7	0.1	7.7
1990–91	Milwaukee	**82***	7	17.3	.433	.000	.687	3.0	1.5	0.6	0.1	6.4
1991–92	Milwaukee	**82**	11	20.2	.448	.288	.667	3.1	1.8	0.8	0.2	**9.0**
1992–93	Golden State	48	12	21.4	.467	.143	.669	**3.3**	1.5	0.6	0.2	8.8
1993–94	Golden State	67	4	16.4	.526	.167	.602	2.9	0.9	0.5	0.2	6.8
1994–95	Philadelphia	47	25	**23.4**	.428	.333	.699	3.2	1.6	0.6	0.1	8.3
1996–97	Sacramento	25	0	12.6	.458	.364	.550	1.5	1.0	0.3	**0.3**	3.6
1997–98	Charlotte	1	0	11.0	.000	.000	.000	0.0	1.0	0.0	0.0	0.0
1997–98	Golden State	4	0	5.8	**.571**	**.667**	.000	1.0	0.3	0.5	0.0	2.5
Career		438	101	18.9	.457	.255	.663	3.0	1.4	0.6	0.1	7.4

=== Playoffs ===
Year	Team	GP	GS	MPG	FG%	3P%	FT%	RPG	APG	SPG	BPG	PPG
1989–90	Milwaukee	**4**	0	3.0	.000	.000	.000	0.5	0.3	0.0	0.0	0.0
1990–91	Milwaukee	3	0	12.3	.385	.000	**.833**	**2.0**	**2.0**	**0.3**	0.0	5.0
1993–94	Golden State	3	0	**15.3**	**.550**	.000	.667	**2.0**	0.3	**0.3**	**0.3**	**8.0**
Career		10	0	9.5	.485	.000	.778	1.4	0.8	0.2	0.1	3.9
