= 1911–12 Missouri Tigers men's basketball team =

American college basketball season

1911–12 Missouri Tigers men's basketball
- Conference: Big Eight Conference
- Record: 5–10 (4–9 MVIAA)
- Head coach: O.F. Field
- Home arena: Rothwell Gymnasium

The 1911–12 Missouri Tigers men's basketball team represented University of Missouri in the 1911–12 college basketball season. The team was led by first year head coach O.F. Field. The captain of the team was Joseph Parker.

Missouri finished with a 5–10 record overall and a 4–9 record in the Missouri Valley Intercollegiate Athletic Association. This was good enough for a 3rd-place finish in the regular season conference standings.

== Schedule and results ==
Date time, TV	Rank^{#}	Opponent^{#}	Result	Record	Site city, state
January 10*		Washburn	W 26–17	1–0	Columbia, Missouri
January 17		Iowa State	W 25–24	2–0 (1–0)	Columbia, Missouri
January 18		Iowa State	W 18–10	3–0 (2–0)	Columbia, Missouri
January 19		at Washington University	L 12–29	3–1 (2–1)	St. Louis, Missouri
January 20		at Washington University	L 14–31	3–2 (2–2)	St. Louis, Missouri
February 8*		at Central Missouri	L 26–30	3–3 (2–2)	Warrensburg, Missouri
February 9		at Kansas	L 16–27	3–4 (2–3)	Lawrence, Kansas
February 10		at Kansas	L 21–31	3–5 (2–4)	Lawrence, Kansas
February 12		Washington University	W 16–8	4–5 (3–4)	Columbia, Missouri
February 13		Washington University	L 16–19	4–6 (3–5)	Columbia, Missouri
February 15		at Drake	W 15–12	5–6 (4–5)	Des Moines, Iowa
February 16		at Iowa State	L 9–27	5–7 (4–6)	Ames, Iowa
February 17		at Iowa State	L 13–32	5–8 (4–7)	Ames, Iowa
February 21		Kansas	L 24–39	5–9 (4–8)	Columbia, Missouri
February 22		Kansas	L 26–32	5–10 (4–9)	Columbia, Missouri
*Non-conference game. ^{#}Rankings from Coaches' Poll. (#) Tournament seedings in parentheses. All times are in Central Standard Time.
