= 1913–14 Wisconsin Badgers men's basketball team =

American college basketball season

1913–14 Wisconsin Badgers men's basketball
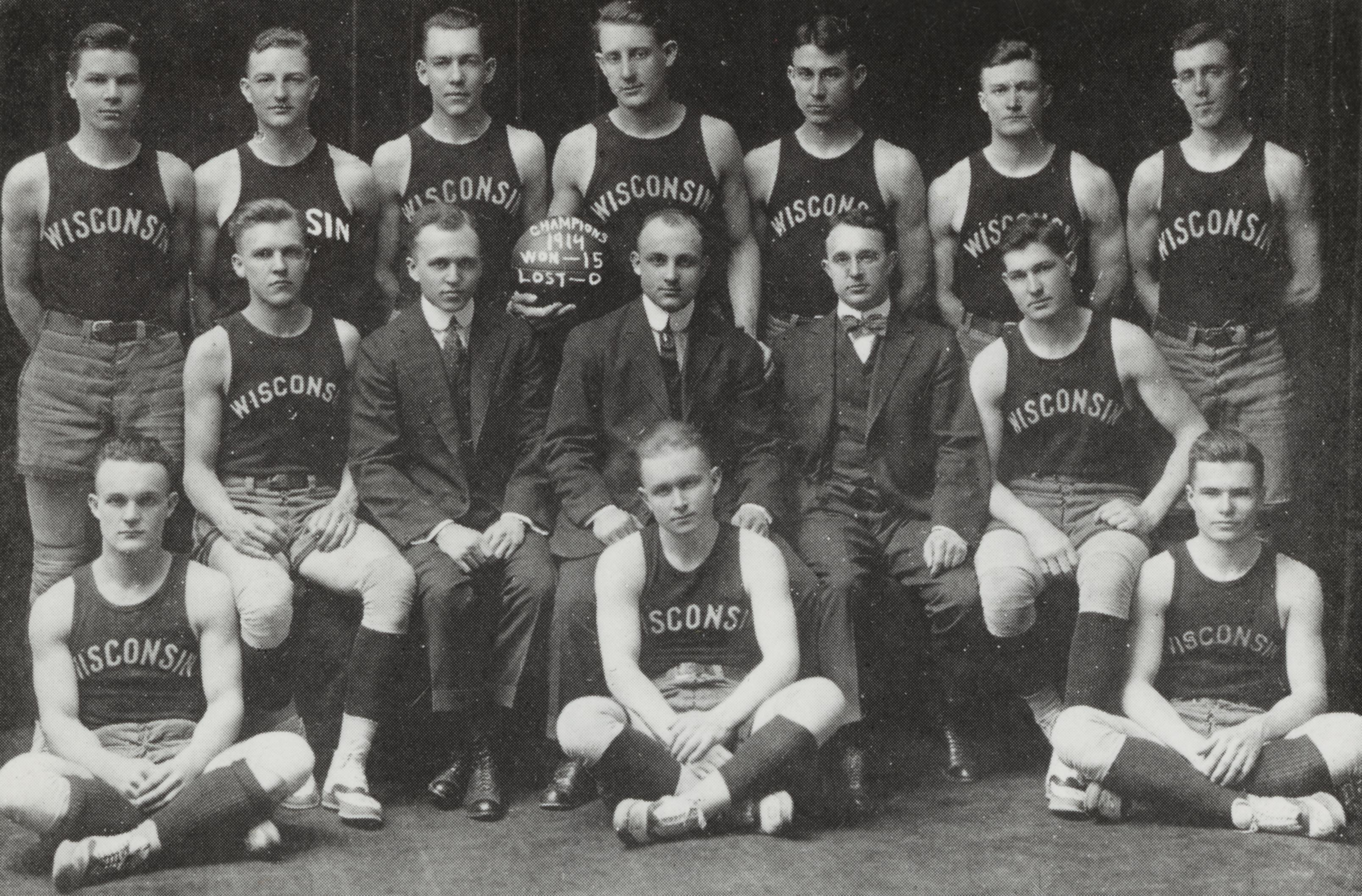

Helms Foundation National Champions Western Conference Champions
- Conference: Big Ten Conference
- Record: 15–0 (12–0 Big Ten)
- Head coach: Walter Meanwell
- Home arena: Red Gym

1913–14 Western Conference men's basketball standings
| | Conf. | | | | Overall |
| Team | W | | L | PCT | W | | L | PCT |
|---|---|---|---|---|---|---|---|---|
| Wisconsin | 12 | – | 0 | 1.000 | 15 | – | 0 | 1.000 |
| Ohio State | 5 | – | 1 | .833 | 11 | – | 4 | .733 |
| Chicago | 8 | – | 4 | .667 | 19 | – | 9 | .679 |
| Illinois | 7 | – | 3 | .700 | 9 | – | 4 | .692 |
| Northwestern | 5 | – | 5 | .500 | 11 | – | 6 | .647 |
| Minnesota | 4 | – | 8 | .333 | 4 | – | 11 | .267 |
| Purdue | 3 | – | 9 | .250 | 5 | – | 9 | .357 |
| Iowa | 1 | – | 5 | .167 | 9 | – | 7 | .563 |
| Indiana | 1 | – | 11 | .083 | 2 | – | 12 | .143 |

The 1913–14 Wisconsin Badgers men's basketball team represented the University of Wisconsin–Madison. The head coach was Walter Meanwell, coaching his third season with the Badgers. The team played their home games at the Red Gym in Madison, Wisconsin and was a member of the Western Conference. The team finished the season with a 15–0 record and won the Western Conference. The team was retroactively named the national champion by the Helms Athletic Foundation and was retroactively named the top team of the season by the Premo-Porretta Power Poll.

== Schedule ==
| Date time, TV | Rank^{#} | Opponent^{#} | Result | Record | Site city, state |
Regular Season
| 12/13/1913* | | Knox (IL) | W 48–15 | 1–0 | Red Gym; Madison, WI |
| 12/18/1913* | | Beloit (WI) | W 45–15 | 2–0 | Red Gym; Madison, WI |
| 1/06/1914* | | Parsons (IA) | W 50–0 | 3–0 | Red Gym; Madison, WI |
| 1/10/1914 | | at Illinois | W 26–25 | 4–0 (1–0) | Kenney Gym; Urbana, IL |
| 1/12/1914 | | at Indiana | W 57–15 | 5–0 (2–0) | Men's Gymnasium; Bloomington, IN |
| 1/17/1914 | | Minnesota | W 28–7 | 6–0 (3–0) | Red Gym; Madison, WI |
| 1/24/1914 | | at Chicago | W 16–14 | 7–0 (4–0) | Bartlett Gymnasium; Chicago, IL |
| 2/10/1914 | | Northwestern | W 38–9 | 8–0 (5–0) | Red Gym; Madison, WI |
| 2/13/1914 | | Purdue | W 25–20 ^{OT} | 9–0 (6–0) | Red Gym; Madison, WI |
| 2/17/1914 | | at Northwestern | W 33–26 | 10–0 (7–0) | Patten Gymnasium; Evanston, IL |
| 2/20/1914 | | Illinois | W 29–16 | 11–0 (8–0) | Red Gym; Madison, WI |
| 2/24/1914 | | Indiana | W 46–24 | 12–0 (9–0) | Red Gym; Madison, WI |
| 2/28/1914 | | at Minnesota | W 27–9 | 13–0 (10–0) | Minnesota Armory; Minneapolis, MN |
| 3/06/1914 | | Chicago | W 25–18 | 14–0 (11–0) | Red Gym; Madison, WI |
| 3/10/1914 | | Purdue | W 27–13 | 15–0 (12–0) | Memorial Gymnasium; West Lafayette, IN |
*Non-conference game. ^{#}Rankings from AP Poll. (#) Tournament seedings in parentheses.
