= 1913–14 Illinois Fighting Illini men's basketball team =

American college basketball season

1913–14 Illinois Fighting Illini men's basketball
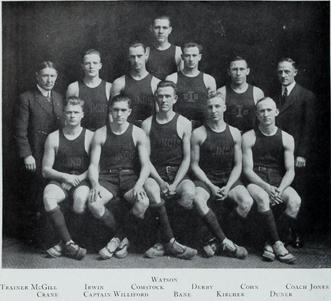
- Conference: Big Ten Conference
- Record: 9–4 (7–3 Big Ten)
- Head coach: Ralph Jones (2nd season)
- Captain: Edward Williford
- Home arena: Kenney Gymnasium Arena

1913–14 Western Conference men's basketball standings
	Conf.				Overall
Team	W		L	PCT	W		L	PCT
Wisconsin	12	–	0	1.000	15	–	0	1.000
Ohio State	5	–	1	.833	11	–	4	.733
Chicago	8	–	4	.667	19	–	9	.679
Illinois	7	–	3	.700	9	–	4	.692
Northwestern	5	–	5	.500	11	–	6	.647
Minnesota	4	–	8	.333	4	–	11	.267
Purdue	3	–	9	.250	5	–	9	.357
Iowa	1	–	5	.167	9	–	7	.563
Indiana	1	–	11	.083	2	–	12	.143

The 1913–14 Illinois Fighting Illini men's basketball team represented the University of Illinois.

== Regular season ==
The 1913–14 University of Illinois Fighting Illini men's basketball team, under the direction of second year coach Ralph Jones, took a step in a positive direction regarding the team's status in the Western Conference. The addition of key players, including future National Player of the Year, Ray Woods, helped guide the Illini to an overall record of nine wins and four losses. The conference record, however, of seven wins and three losses marked, to date, the highest league winning percentage in the history of the university. Unfortunately for the Illini, a scarlet fever scare caused the last two games of the year to be cancelled, including a game at Chicago and at Northwestern. The team finished fourth in the conference with a starting squad of Kircher, Williford, Bane, Crane & Duner would return the following season.

=== Roster ===
1913–14 Illinois Fighting Illini men's basketball team
Players
Coaches

Pos.	#	Name	Height	Weight	Year	Hometown
G		Sven Duner	—	—	Jr	Downers Grove, Illinois
F		Helmuth Kircher	—	—	Jr	Kalamazoo, Michigan
C		Edward Williford (C)	—	—	Jr	Binghamton, New York
G		Ray Woods	—	—	Fr	Oak Park, Illinois
G		Ralf Woods	—	—	Fr	Oak Park, Illinois
C		Frank M. Bane	—	—	Jr	Pontiac, Illinois
G		Dudley Crane	—	—	So	Columbus, Ohio
F		Clyde Alwood	—	—	Fr	Clinton, Illinois
F		George Clark	—	—	So	Lincoln, Nebraska
G		Robert William Hoffman	—	—	Jr	Detroit, Michigan
C		Daniel Franklin Comstock	—	—	Jr	Evanston, Illinois
F		Walter Boynton Erwin	—	—	Jr	Chicago, Illinois
F		Milton Owen Jensen	—	—	Jr	Kansas City, Missouri
F		Sylvester Randall Derby	—	—	Jr	Lemont, Illinois

Head coach

- Ralph Jones (Indianapolis YMCA Training School) (2nd year)

Assistant coach(es)

Legend

- (C) Team captain
- (S) Suspended
- (I) Ineligible
- (W) Walk-on
- Injured
- Current redshirt

Roster

== Schedule ==
Date time, TV	Rank^{#}	Opponent^{#}	Result	Record	Site city, state
Non-Conference regular season
12/18/1913*		Millikin	W 19–10	1-0	Kenney Gym; Urbana, IL
1/2/1914*		at Riverside High School	W 46–17	2-0	Riverside High School; LaGrange, IL
1/3/1914*		at Evanston YMCA	L 20–24	2-1	Evanston YMCA; Evanston, IL
Big Ten regular season
1/6/1914		Indiana; Rivalry	W 35–6	3-1 (1-0)	Kenney Gym; Urbana, IL
1/10/1914		Wisconsin	L 25–26	3-2 (1-1)	Kenney Gym; Urbana, IL
1/17/1914		Purdue	W 26–20	4-2 (2-1)	Kenney Gym; Urbana, IL
1/20/1914		University of Chicago	L 11–12	4-3 (2-2)	Kenney Gym; Urbana, IL
1/23/1914		Minnesota	W 18–16	5-3 (3-2)	Kenney Gym; Urbana, IL
2/6/1914		at Purdue	W 30–25	6-3 (4-2)	Memorial Gymnasium; West Lafayette, IN
2/7/1914		at Indiana; Rivalry	W 31–15	7-3 (5-2)	Old Assembly Hall; Bloomington, IN
2/14/1914		Northwestern; Rivalry	W 35–15	8-3 (6-2)	Kenney Gym; Urbana, IL
2/20/1914		at Wisconsin	L 16–29	8-4 (6-3)	University of Wisconsin Armory and Gymnasium; Madison, WI
2/21/1914		at Minnesota	W 26–11	9-4 (7-3)	University of Minnesota Armory; Minneapolis, MN
*Non-conference game. ^{#}Rankings from AP Poll. (#) Tournament seedings in parentheses. All times are in Central Time.

== Awards and honors ==
Ray Woods was elected to the "Illini Men's Basketball All-Century Team" in 2004.
