= Alcott Neary =

American athlete and coach (1892–1941)

Biographical details
- Born: February 6, 1892; Gouverneur, New York, U.S.
- Died: July 28, 1941 (aged 49); Rochester, New York, U.S.

Playing career

Football
- 1912–1913: Rochester (NY)

Basketball
- 1910–1913: Rochester (NY)
- Positions: Quarterback (football); Forward (basketball)

Coaching career (HC unless noted)

Football
- 1916: Rochester (NY)
- 1919: Rochester (NY)

Basketball
- 1914–1915: Fordham
- 1918–1919: Rochester (NY)

Administrative career (AD unless noted)
- 1914–1915: Fordham

Head coaching record
- Overall: 9–6–2 (football); 19–25 (basketball)

Edward Alcott Neary (February 6, 1892 – July 28, 1941) was an American football and basketball player and coach. He served as the head football coach at the University of Rochester in 1916 and 1919 and was head coach of the school's basketball team during the 1918–19 season. Prior to coaching at Rochester, Neary served as the head basketball coach at Fordham University during the 1914–15 season. Neary died on July 28, 1941, in Rochester, New York, after suffering from heat-induced heart failure in his parked car.

== Head coaching record ==
=== Football ===
Year	Team	Overall	Conference	Standing	Bowl/playoffs
Rochester Yellowjackets (Independent) (1916)
1916	Rochester	6–3			
Rochester Yellowjackets (Independent) (1919)
1919	Rochester	3–3–2			
Rochester:		9–6–2			
Total:		9–6–2			
