= Osmond F. Field =

American sports coach (1886–1965)

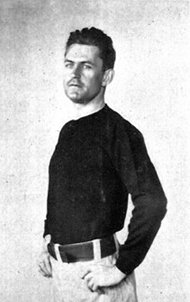

Biographical details
- Born: October 3, 1886; Lowell, Massachusetts, U.S.
- Died: November 13, 1965 (aged 79); Orange County, California, U.S.

Coaching career (HC unless noted)

Basketball
- 1911: Nebraska
- 1911–1914: Missouri

Baseball
- 1912–1913: Missouri

Head coaching record
- Overall: 31–36 (basketball)

Osmond F. Field (October 3, 1886 – November 13, 1965) was an American basketball, baseball, and track and field coach. He served as the head basketball (1911–14) and baseball coach (1912–1913) at the University of Missouri. At the University of Nebraska, he served as track and field coach (1910–11) and head basketball coach (1911).

== Head coaching record ==
=== Basketball ===
Record table
Season	Team	Overall	Conference	Standing	Postseason
Nebraska Cornhuskers (Missouri Valley Conference) (1910–1911)
1910–11	Nebraska	9–9			
Nebraska:		9–9			
Missouri Tigers (Missouri Valley Conference) (1911–1914)
1911–12	Missouri	5–10	1–7	3rd	
1912–13	Missouri	13–5	6–2	2nd	
1913–14	Missouri	4–12	4–12	4th	
Missouri:		22–27			
Total:		31–36			
