= Iowa State Cyclones men's basketball =

Men's basketball team of Iowa State University

2026–27 Iowa State Cyclones men's basketball team
- University: Iowa State University
- First season: 1907–08; 119 years ago
- Athletic director: Jared Benko
- Head coach: T. J. Otzelberger; 6th season, 124–52 (.705)
- Location: Ames, Iowa
- Arena: Hilton Coliseum (capacity: 14,267)
- NCAA division: Division I
- Conference: Big 12
- Nickname: Cyclones
- Colors: Cardinal and gold
- Student section: Cyclone Alley
- All-time record: 1,514–1,416 (.517)
- NCAA tournament record: 26–24 (.520)

NCAA Division I tournament Final Four
- 1944
Other NCAA Division I tournament results
Elite Eight	1944, 2000
Sweet Sixteen	1986, 1997, 2000, 2014, 2016, 2022, 2024, 2026
Appearances	1944, 1985, 1986, 1988, 1989, 1992, 1993, 1995, 1996, 1997, 2000, 2001, 2005, 2012, 2013, 2014, 2015, 2016, 2017, 2019, 2022, 2023, 2024, 2025, 2026

Conference tournament champions
- Big Eight: 1996 Big 12: 2000, 2014, 2015, 2017, 2019, 2024

Conference regular-season champions
- Big Eight: 1935, 1941, 1944, 1945 Big 12: 2000, 2001

Conference division champions
- MVIAA North: 1910

Uniforms
Home	Away	Alternate

The Iowa State Cyclones men's basketball team represents Iowa State University (ISU) and competes in the Big 12 Conference of NCAA Division I. The Cyclones play their home games at Hilton Coliseum on Iowa State's campus.

== History ==
=== Early years (1908–1980) ===
From 1907 to 1928, the Cyclones played in the Missouri Valley Intercollegiate Athletic Association, managing a few winning records in-conference but no championships. In 1929, the Cyclones moved to the Big Six Conference and named Louis Menze as head coach. Over the next 19 years, Menze would lead the Cyclones to four conference championships (their only seasons with a winning conference record in this period). Two of these teams earned consideration for the then eight-team NCAA tournament; the 1941 squad lost in a pre-Tournament "qualifying game" to Creighton. Three years later, the 1944 team beat Pepperdine to reach the semifinals in the tournament proper before losing its next game against eventual champion Utah, good for a spot in history as a Final Four participant.

After Menze's last conference win in 1945 and subsequent resignation as coach in 1947 (he would remain Iowa State's athletic director until 1958, having taken the position in 1945), the Cyclones floated between the bottom and the middle of the conference for decades, their main claim to fame being two wins of the conference's annual "Holiday tournament", played between Christmas and New Year's Day in Kansas City, in 1955 and 1959. Neither these tournament wins, nor their regular season performances, qualified the Cyclones for postseason play in the 33 years between Menze's and Johnny Orr's stints in the head coaching position. However, the 1957 Cyclones were ranked #3 in the nation after handing Wilt Chamberlain's #1 Kansas its first loss.

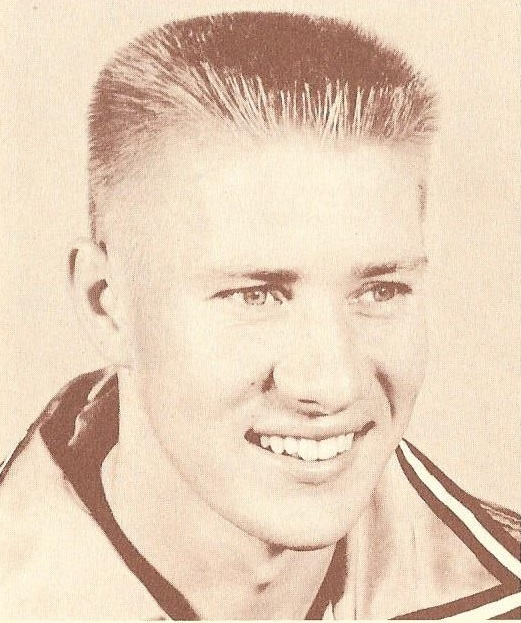
Gary Thompson

Gary Thompson outscored Chamberlain, while Don Medsker held Chamberlain to 17 points the 2nd lowest of his career and then hit the game winner at the buzzer. From the introduction of the Big Eight's postseason tournament in 1977 until Johnny Orr's fifth season in 1985, the Cyclones did not advance past their first game.

In 1971, Maury John left Drake University to move to Iowa State. John led Drake to the 1969 NCAA Final Four and the Elite Eight in 1970 NCAA tournament and 1971 NCAA tournament. John inherited an Iowa State team that was 5–21 the previous season. John was excited about the new Hilton Coliseum and led Iowa State to a 12–14 record in 1971–72 and a 16–10 record in 1972–73, a 15-year best. On Dec. 2, 1971, in the first game played at Hilton Coliseum, John led the Cyclones to a victory over Arizona 71–54. Said Cyclone announcer Eric Heft, a player for Coach John: "The place was sold out for the Arizona game and we doubled the capacity of season tickets from the season before. We didn't have all the fanfare you have today, but it was packed. It was my first game and Maury John's first game as the head Cyclone coach as well."

In the 1973–74 season, Iowa State was off to a 4–1 start. However, John sat out the remainder of the 1973–74 season after a cancer diagnosis. Assistant Gus Guydon (11–10) finished the season. In October 1973, John had seen a doctor after having health concerns. Two months later, on the day his Iowa State team lost at Drake, John was told he had an inoperable malignant tumor at the base of his esophagus. "It was a bolt out of the blue for someone who lived his life free of smoking or drinking," his son John said later. "There was high stress. But he was always healthy."

John was optimistic about returning to Iowa State in 1974–75, but his health worsened and he resigned on July 30, 1974. John said "It's going to be hard for me not to be on that bench. I won't have to sweat out all those games down on the floor. But truthfully, I'd rather be down there sweating them out." John died on October 15, 1974, at the age of 55. During a 28‐year coaching career, John had a 528–214 record. John's departure sent the Cyclones into free fall. In the next six years, Iowa State would only have one winning season, bottoming out in 1975–76 with a 3–24 record, still the worst in school history.

=== Johnny Orr era (1980–1994) ===
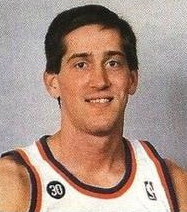
Jeff Hornacek

Johnny Orr came to Iowa State from Michigan in 1980. Iowa State's athletics director had called Orr to inquire about Michigan assistant Bill Frieder. When Orr learned of the salary Iowa State would offer Frieder, he negotiated the Iowa State head coaching job for himself. Orr is credited with building "Hilton Magic" and laying the foundation for Iowa State's success in men's basketball. A number of Cyclone greats played for Orr, including Jeff Grayer, Barry Stevens, walk-on Jeff Hornacek, Lafester Rhodes, Justus Thigpen, Victor Alexander, Fred Hoiberg, Julius Michalik, and Loren Meyer, many of whom would go on to success in the NBA.

Orr's first team (1980–81), led by junior forward Robert Estes (14.9 points per game, 6.7 rebounds per game) produced a lackluster 9–18 record. Freshman forward Ron Harris, whom Orr considered his first prominent Cyclone recruit, contributed per-game averages of 13.7 points and 5.9 rebounds.

Led by sophomore Ron Harris and freshman recruit Barry Stevens of Flint, Michigan, Orr's 1981–82 team finished the season with a 10–17 overall record and a 5–9 record in Big Eight play. Harris gave the Cyclones 13.3 points per game, while Stevens contributed 13.0 points per game. Senior Robert Estes added 10.3 points per game.

The Cyclones improved to a 13–15 overall record in the 1982–83 season, but again finished 5–9 in conference play. Many of the Cyclone faithful regard sophomore Barry Stevens' buzzer-beating shot against 10th-ranked Missouri during the 1982–83 season as the foundational example of "Hilton Magic." Stevens tallied per-game averages of 16.8 points and 5.2 rebounds for the season. Ron Harris contributed 14.3 points per game.

Orr's 1983–84 team recorded the first winning season of his tenure at Iowa State—and the first winning season for Cyclone basketball since Lynn Nance's 1977–78 team finished 14–13—with a 16–13 overall mark and a 6–8 record in conference play. The Cyclones played in the 1984 National Invitation Tournament (NIT), losing to Marquette in the first round. Junior forward Barry Stevens averaged 22.2 points per game on the season. Seniors Terrence Allen and Ron Harris each averaged 11.0 points per game.

Led by senior Barry Stevens and freshman forward Jeff Grayer, natives of Flint, Michigan known at Iowa State as "The Flintstones", the 1984–85 Cyclones finished tied for third in conference play (7–7) and finished 21–13 overall. Iowa State advanced to the NCAA tournament for the first time under Orr and for just the second time in the history of the program. The Cyclones, the #13 seed in the Midwest Region, lost to #4 seed Ohio State by a score of 75–64. ISU managed to upset 10th-ranked Kansas twice during the regular season. Stevens averaged 21.7 points per game. Junior guard Jeff Hornacek recorded 12.5 points per game, and Grayer averaged 12.2 points and 6.5 rebounds on the season.

Despite the departure of two-time first-team All-Big Eight forward Stevens, the 1985–86 campaign saw First-team All-Big Eight players Grayer and Hornacek lead the Cyclones to their most successful season yet under Orr. Iowa State finished with a 22–11 overall mark and a 9–5 record and second-place finish in conference play. The Cyclones advanced to the NCAA tournament in consecutive years for the first time in school history. With wins over #10 seed Miami (Ohio) and #2 seed Michigan, the #7 seed Cyclones reached the "Sweet Sixteen" before falling to #6 seed North Carolina State, 70–66. Grayer led the Cyclones with per-game averages of 20.7 points and 6.3 rebounds. Hornacek averaged 13.7 points per game. The Cyclones upset 5th-ranked Oklahoma and 4th-ranked Kansas during the regular season.

The 1986–87 Cyclones finished with a 13–15 overall record and a 5–9 record in Big Eight play, missing postseason tournament competition for the first time in four seasons. Grayer (now a junior) averaged 22 points and 7 rebounds per game, while senior Tom Schafer averaged 18 points and 6 rebounds. Despite their struggles, the 1986–87 Cyclones managed wins over two ranked teams (15th-ranked Kansas and 12th-ranked Oklahoma).

Orr's 1987–88 Cyclones rebounded from the losing season of the prior year to finish 20–12 overall and 6–8 in conference play, including wins over #2 Purdue, #7 Iowa, #16 Kansas, and #15 Missouri. Iowa State returned to the NCAA tournament, losing 90–78 to #5 seed Georgia Tech in the first round. The Cyclones were led by senior and three-time first-team All-Big Eight forward Jeff Grayer and senior Lafester Rhodes, who averaged 25 and 22 points per game, respectively.

The 1988–89 Cyclones finished the season 17–12 overall and 7–7 in conference play, including a victory over third-ranked Missouri in Hilton Coliseum. The Cyclones advanced to their fourth NCAA tournament under Orr, losing 84–74 to #7 seed UCLA in the first round. Sophomore Victor Alexander averaged 20 points and 9 rebounds per game on the season. Sophomore Mark Baugh averaged 13.3 points per game, while Sam Mack contributed per-game averages of 11.8 points and 8.1 rebounds.

Following the loss of key players to attrition and legal problems in the offseason, the 1989–90 Cyclones finished 10–18 overall and 4–10 in conference play, marking the Cyclones' second-worst season under Orr. Only Orr's 1980–81 team, his first at ISU, had finished with a worse overall record. Junior Victor Alexander averaged 19.7 points and 8.7 rebounds per game. Senior guard Terry Woods averaged 16 points per game.

The 1990–91 season saw the Cyclones finish with an overall record of 12–19 and a conference record of 6–8. Despite their poor overall performance, the Cyclones managed wins over two ranked teams (#12 Oklahoma State and #21 Oklahoma). Senior Victor Alexander averaged 23.4 points per game and 9.0 rebounds per game, while senior Doug Collins averaged 14.3 points per game.

Iowa State's fortunes improved during the 1991–92 season, with the Cyclones finishing 21–13 overall (5–9 in conference play) and earning the #10 seed in the East Region of the NCAA tournament. The Cyclones defeated #7 seed UNC Charlotte in the opening round before losing 106–98 to #2 seed Kentucky in the round of 32. Iowa State recorded wins over #16 Iowa, #21 Oklahoma, #2 Oklahoma State, #3 Kansas, and #13 Missouri during the regular season. Junior Justus Thigpen led the team with 16.3 points per game, while junior Ron Bayless averaged 12.6 points per game. Freshmen Julius Michalik and Fred Hoiberg averaged 13.6 and 12.1 points per game, respectively.

Iowa State finished the 1992–93 season with a 20–11 overall record and a second-place 8–6 record in conference play. The Cyclones advanced to their sixth and final NCAA tournament under head coach Johnny Orr, losing in the first round to #9 seed UCLA, 81–70. Iowa State managed victories over #12 Oklahoma and #7 Kansas during the regular season. Seniors Justus Thigpen and Ron Bayless led the team with 17.6 points and 13.3 points per game, respectively. Sophomore Julius Michalik and Ames native and sophomore Fred Hoiberg contributed 12.0 and 11.6 points per game, respectively.

In the 1993–94 campaign—Orr's final season as Iowa State men's basketball head coach—the Cyclones posted a 14–13 overall mark and a 4–10 record in conference play. ISU was led by a trio of juniors—Loren Meyer, Fred Hoiberg, and Julius Michalik, each of whom averaged over 20 points per game on the season.

Orr retired from coaching in 1994. He remains the winningest coach in Iowa State history (in terms of total wins), with a win–loss record of 218–200 as the head coach of the Cyclones.

=== Tim Floyd era (1994–1998) ===
Following Johnny Orr's retirement, Iowa State hired Tim Floyd from the University of New Orleans to become the next men's basketball head coach. Floyd's first ISU team recorded a 23–11 overall mark and a 6–8 mark in conference play, advancing to the second round of the 1995 NCAA tournament by beating Florida, 64–61, before losing 73–51 to #2 seed North Carolina. Senior Fred Hoiberg averaged 19.9 points per game. Seniors Loren Meyer and Julius Michalik averaged 15.7 points and 9.0 rebounds per game and 14.3 points and 5.4 rebounds per game, respectively.

Following the graduation of four starters from the 1994–95 Cyclones, Tim Floyd replenished his roster with several junior college and Division I transfers. Four of the 1995–96 team's starters had not been part of the ISU roster during the prior season, with sophomore point guard Jacy Holloway being the lone exception. Dedric Willoughby transferred to Iowa State from the University of New Orleans, and Kenny Pratt, Shawn Bankhead, and Kelvin Cato each transferred from junior colleges to play for the Cyclones. The 1995–96 Cyclones finished with a 24–9 overall record, a second-place 9–5 conference record, and the final Big Eight tournament championship—the first conference tournament championship in Cyclone basketball history—with a 56–55 victory over Roy Williams' Kansas Jayhawks. Iowa State earned the #5 seed in the Midwest Region of the NCAA tournament, the then-highest seed achieved in ISU men's basketball history. The Cyclones defeated #12 seed California 74–64 in the first round of the Tournament; Rick Majerus' #4 seed Utah Utes defeated ISU 73–67 in the second round. Dedric Willoughby averaged 20.5 points per game on the season. Kenny Pratt averaged 15.3 points and 6.5 rebounds per game, while Kelvin Cato contributed per-game averages of 9.6 points and 7.7 rebounds.

The 1996–97 Cyclones returned all five starters from the previous season's Big Eight tournament championship and NCAA Tournament team. Iowa State finished with a 22–9 overall record and a 10–6 conference mark in the inaugural season of the expanded Big 12 Conference. The Cyclones would advance to the third NCAA tournament Sweet Sixteen in Iowa State men's basketball history with victories over Illinois State and Cincinnati, before falling in a 74–73 overtime loss to UCLA. Senior Dedric Willoughby averaged 18.9 points per game for the season, and seniors Kenny Pratt and Kelvin Cato averaged 14.7 points and 6.1 rebounds per game and 11.3 points and 8.4 rebounds per game, respectively.

Tim Floyd's 1997–98 Cyclones finished the season with a 12–18 overall record and a 5–11 conference record. Freshman forward Marcus Fizer averaged 14.9 points and 6.7 rebounds per game, and Klay Edwards contributed per-game averages of 9.3 points and 7.7 rebounds. Following the season, Floyd left Iowa State to replace Phil Jackson as the head coach of the Chicago Bulls.

=== Larry Eustachy era (1998–2003) ===
Iowa State hired Larry Eustachy from Utah State to fill the head coaching position vacated by Tim Floyd. In his first season, Eustachy led the Cyclones to 15–15 overall record and a 6–10 record in Big 12 play. Sophomore Marcus Fizer averaged 18 points and 7.6 rebounds per game. Michael Nurse and Martin Rancik both averaged 10.3 points per game.

Following his first season, Eustachy gained the services of two guards, Jamaal Tinsley and Kantrail Horton, via transfer. The 1999–2000 Cyclones returned Marcus Fizer, Martin Rancik, Michael Nurse, and Stevie Johnson from the previous season's team. Iowa State finished the season 32–5 overall, setting a school record for wins in a season. The Cyclones finished 14–2 in conference play to earn the outright Big 12 Conference regular season championship—the sixth regular season conference title in the program's history, and the first since 1945. The Cyclones then defeated Oklahoma 70–58 in the Big 12 basketball tournament finals to win the Big 12 conference tournament championship, the second conference tournament title in ISU men's basketball history. The #2 seed Cyclones advanced to the Elite Eight of the 2000 NCAA tournament after wins over #15 seed Central Connecticut State, #7 seed Auburn, and #6 seed UCLA by 10, 19, and 24 points, respectively, but ultimately fell to Michigan State, the eventual NCAA Champion, in the regional finals by a score of 75–64 (the differential representing the Spartans' narrowest margin of victory during the tournament). It was the Cyclones' deepest NCAA Tournament run in the modern era. The Big 12 champion Cyclones were led in scoring by All-American forward and eventual fourth pick of the 2000 NBA draft Marcus Fizer, who averaged 22.8 points per game and 7.7 rebounds per game. Michael Nurse and first team All-Big 12 guard Jamaal Tinsley contributed 12.5 points and 11 points per game, respectively.

Despite the departure of Marcus Fizer to the NBA, Eustachy's 2000–01 Cyclones, led by returning senior and eventual All-American guard Jamaal Tinsley and senior Kantrail Horton, managed a 25–6 overall record and a 13–3 record in conference play, earning a second consecutive Big 12 regular season championship. Iowa State earned a #2 seed in the NCAA tournament, but the Cyclones' season ended with a stunning 58–57 defeat at the hands of #15 seed Hampton. Iowa State became just the fourth #2 seed to lose to a #15 seed since the expansion of the Tournament field to 64 teams in 1985. Jamaal Tinsley led the team in scoring with 14.3 points per game. Martin Rancik and freshman Jake Sullivan added 13.2 points per game and 11.4 points per game, respectively.

The 2001–02 Cyclones produced the worst overall men's basketball record since the 1990–91 season, finishing 12–19 overall record and 4–12 in conference play. Tyray Pearson averaged 18.7 points and 7.8 rebounds per game. Jake Sullivan and Shane Power contributed per-game averages of 16 points and 13.6 points, respectively.

The 2002–03 Cyclones finished with a 17–14 overall record and a 5–11 conference record. ISU accepted an invitation to the NIT. The Cyclones defeated Wichita State in the opening (play-in) round, but fell 54–53 to Iowa in the first round. Jake Sullivan led the team in scoring with 17 points per game. Jackson Vroman contributed 12.5 points and 9.4 rebounds per game. Junior point guard Tim Barnes averaged 11.3 points per game.

Following the 2002–03 season, pictures surfaced showing Larry Eustachy at a student party in Columbia, Missouri. Eustachy attended the party just hours after his team had lost to Missouri. Though Eustachy broke no laws, he did violate a conduct clause in his contract, which led to Eustachy's public admission of alcoholism. Eustachy subsequently resigned on May 5, 2003, receiving a $960,000 settlement from Iowa State.

=== Wayne Morgan & Greg McDermott era (2003–2010) ===
After Eustachy's resignation, Iowa State promoted Wayne Morgan, who had previously served as an assistant coach, to the head coach position. Morgan's first team, in the 2003–04 season, went 20–13 overall and 7–9 in the conference, earning an invitation to the NIT. Iowa State reached the NIT semifinals with wins over Georgia, Florida State, and Marquette, before falling to Rutgers. Freshman Curtis Stinson led the team in scoring, averaging 16.2 points per game. The following season, a 19–12 (9–7) record earned Iowa State a 9-seed in the NCAA Tournament. The team defeated the University of Minnesota in a 1st-round game, but then lost to eventual national champion North Carolina. Stinson, fellow sophomore Will Blalock, and senior Jared Homan led the team in scoring, assists, and rebounds, respectively. In 2005–06, the team, still led by Stinson and Blalock, took a step back to a 16–14 (6–10) record. Following the season, CBS Sportsline reported that Morgan had paid a company to arrange the team's non-conference scheduling in exchange for recruiting assistance. Iowa State athletic director Jamie Pollard fired Morgan two days after the story was released. Morgan's win-loss record from 2003 to 2006 was 55–39.

To replace Morgan, Iowa State hired Greg McDermott, who previously coached at Northern Iowa. During McDermott's tenure, he recruited Craig Brackins, Michael Taylor, Justin Hamilton, Diante Garrett and Wes Johnson, all of whom would eventually play in the NBA. In 2010, McDermott resigned to accept the head coaching position at Creighton. From 2006 to 2010 Greg McDermott recorded a won lost record of 59–68 with no NCAA appearances. He was replaced by Fred Hoiberg.

=== Fred Hoiberg era (2010–2015) ===
On April 27, 2010, it was announced that Fred Hoiberg, a star at Iowa State in the early and mid-1990s, would become the 19th coach in the history of the Iowa State men's basketball program. In his first season as coach, Hoiberg led a team with only four returning players to a 16–16 record.

In his second season, Iowa State had a much deeper team with players such as Royce White, Chris Babb, and others now eligible to play after sitting out the previous year due to transfer rules. The Cyclones improved to 23–11, had 12 wins in the conference, and earned a #8 seed in the South Regional in the 2012 NCAA tournament, earning Hoiberg Big 12 Co-Coach of the Year honors. The Cyclones defeated the #9 seed and defending national champion Connecticut Huskies before falling to overall #1 seed and eventual champion Kentucky.

In Hoiberg's third season, the Cyclones earned a #10 seed and defeated #7 Notre Dame to advance to the Round of 32. It was the first year the Cyclones had been to the NCAA Tournament in back-to-back years since 2000–01, and the first time the Cyclones had won Tournament games in successive seasons since 1996–97.

Hoiberg entered his fourth season at Iowa State by guiding the team to its best start to a season with a 14–0 undefeated non-conference record before suffering its first loss to Big 12 rival Oklahoma, 87–82, on January 11, 2014, in Norman. The winning streak included victories over #7 Michigan and #23 Iowa, plus wins over George Mason, Akron, and Boise State to capture the Diamond Head Classic in Honolulu, Hawaii. The Cyclones entered the Big 12 men's basketball tournament with a 23–7 mark. After a close call with Kansas State in the quarterfinals, Iowa State faced Kansas in the semifinals, the only team it had not beaten at least once all year to that point. ISU emerged victorious this time, beating the Jayhawks, 94–83. Iowa State went on to beat Baylor in the Big 12 championship game, 74–65, for its first conference tournament title since 2000.

The Cyclones earned a #3 seed in the East Regional of the 2014 NCAA tournament and defeated their first opponent, North Carolina Central, 93–75. Another close call came next in the second-round game against North Carolina, with ISU prevailing, 85–83. The Cyclones advanced to the Sweet Sixteen for the first time since 2000, and lost to #7 seed Connecticut, 81–76 (the differential representing the Huskies' narrowest margin of victory during the tournament), the eventual national champion. This marked the third time in their last four trips to the NCAA Tournament that the Cyclones lost to the eventual national champions (2005 North Carolina, 2012 Kentucky, and 2014 Connecticut.)

In 2014–15, Hoiberg's Cyclones finished the season with a 25–9 overall record and 12–6 in the Big 12, finishing second to Kansas in the conference regular season. ISU defeated Texas, 69–67, Oklahoma, 67–65, and Kansas, 70–66, in the championship to win its second straight Big 12 Conference tournament championship. Invited to the NCAA Tournament for the fourth consecutive year, the #3 seed Cyclones were upset by #14 seed UAB, 60–59, in the first round. The Cyclones finished the season ranked ninth in the final AP poll. After several weeks of speculation, Fred Hoiberg was hired on June 2, 2015, by the NBA's Chicago Bulls to be their head coach.

=== Steve Prohm era (2015–2021) ===
On June 8, 2015, Iowa State announced that Steve Prohm, previously the head coach at Murray State for four seasons, would become the 20th head coach of the Cyclones. After the departure of Fred Hoiberg, Prohm retained Assistant Coach T.J. Otzelberger and Assistant Coach Director of Basketball Operations Micah Byars on his staff, while making the additions of Assistant Coach William Small (formerly under Prohm as an assistant at Murray State), Assistant Coach Daniyal Robinson (formerly on staff at Loyola Chicago), and Special Assistant to the Head Coach Neill Berry, who was previously on staff at High Point and played for Prohm in college at Southeastern Louisiana. Prohm's first season was a success with a few bumps along the way. The Cyclones finished the regular season 10–8 in conference play and 21–10 overall; this included wins over No. 1 Oklahoma and No. 4 Kansas. Forward Georges Niang became the fourth men's player in program history to be named a consensus All-American, averaging 20.5 points, 6.2 rebounds, and 3.3 assists. The Cyclones then received a No. 4 seed in the NCAA tournament. After wins over Iona and Arkansas–Little Rock, they advanced to the Sweet Sixteen, where they lost to Virginia. After the conclusion of the season, Otzelberger accepted the head coaching job at South Dakota State, and Neill Berry was promoted to assistant coach.

On February 4, 2017, Iowa State won at No. 3 Kansas, ending the longest active home win streak in NCAA men's college basketball at 54 games. Iowa State became the first team to beat Bill Self more than once at Allen Fieldhouse. The Cyclones then proceeded to win their third conference tournament title in four years with wins over Oklahoma State, TCU and West Virginia. The Cyclones were selected as a five seed in NCAA tournament, where they proceeded to beat the University of Nevada in the tournament's second round. Iowa State then lost to 4-seed Purdue in the round of 32, 80–76.

After a down 2017–2018 season, in 2018-2019 the Cyclones went 23–12 and 9–9 in the Big 12 conference. They faced Baylor in the first round of the Big 12 Tournament, winning 83–66. They next beat number 1 seed Kansas State, 63–59. They played Kansas in the Big 12 Championship and won 78–66. They were a 6 seed in the NCAA tournament, where they lost in the first round to Ohio State, an 11 seed. On March 26, Iowa State announced that Prohm's contract had been extended through 2025, while sophomore forward Cameron Lard requested a transfer from the school, citing the need for a fresh start.

Following a disappointing 2–22 season (0–18 in the Big 12), on March 15, 2021, Prohm was fired as the head men's basketball coach.

=== T.J. Otzelberger era (2021–present) ===
On March 18, 2021, T. J. Otzelberger, who had been the head coach at UNLV for the previous two seasons, was named the 21st head coach at Iowa State. Otzelberger had previously been an assistant under three head coaches at ISU. The 2021–2022 season was an incredible turnaround from the prior year's two-win campaign. The Cyclones finished 22–13 in Otzelberger's first season with victories over Texas Tech, Texas, Memphis, and Iowa. The team went undefeated in nonconference play, suffering its first loss to #1 ranked Baylor on January 1, 2022. The Cyclones would qualify for the NCAA tournament as an 11-seed, and would lose in the Sweet 16 to the University of Miami.

The team continued its growth in the 2022–23 season. The Cyclones went 19–14 overall and 9–9 in conference play, ending tied for 6th. They would advance to the semifinals in the Big 12 tournament, but would lose to Kansas 71–58. The Cyclones earned a 6-seed in the 2023 NCAA Tournament, but were upset by No. 11 Pittsburgh in the first round.

The 2023–2024 season saw Iowa State continue its success under Coach Otzelberger. The Cyclones started 11–2 in non-conference play, finishing the season with an overall record of 27–7 and a conference record of 13–5, a second-place finish in the Big 12. The Cyclones won the Big 12 Championship, defeating No. 9 Kansas State 76–57, No. 4 Baylor 76–62, and obliterating No. 1 Houston 69–41 in the largest blowout in the history of the Big 12 championship game. They would end ranked No. 4 on the AP Top 25 and with the best defense in the nation. In the NCAA Men's Tournament, the team entered as a No. 2 seed and defeated No. 15 South Dakota State Jackrabbits and No. 7 Washington State in the opening rounds, to move on to the Sweet 16. There the Cyclones saw the season end, falling to No.3 Illinois 72–69.

The 2024–2025 season saw Iowa State continue its regular season success. The Cyclones started strong with a 10–1 record in nonconference play, including a win over #5 ranked Marquette University at Hilton Coliseum. The Cyclones finished the season with an overall record of 25-10 and a 13–7 conference record, good for 5th in the Big 12 conference. During the 2025 Big 12 Tournament, the Cyclones would defeat Cincinnati 76–56 before falling 96–92 to BYU in the quarterfinals. During the conference tournament, star guard and team leader in assists, Keshon Gilbert, reaggravated a nagging groin injury that would cause him to miss the entirety of the NCAA tournament. During the 2024–2025 season, Iowa State would achieve its highest AP poll ranking ever at the time, receiving a No. 2 ranking for the first time in program history on January 13, 2025. Guard Curtis Jones was named Big 12 Sixth Man of the Year after averaging 17.4 points per game off the bench. Iowa State was selected as a 3 seed in the NCAA Men's Tournament and defeated No. 14 Lipscomb in the first round before falling 91–78 to No. 6 Ole Miss in the second round as Gilbert's absence was felt.

The 2025–2026 season saw Iowa State have their best start to a season in school history, going undefeated in non-conference play and starting with a 16–0 record, both the best start and longest winning streak in program history. This streak included an 81–58 win against No. 1 ranked Purdue at Mackey Arena, which tied the largest home loss by a No. 1 ranked team in NCAA Division 1 history. The Cyclones finished the season with a 29–8 record with wins over No. 1 Purdue, No. 2 Houston, No. 9 Kansas, and No. 15 St. John's. Iowa State again rose as high as No. 2 in the AP poll, being voted No. 2 for the January 12th, 2026 AP poll. During the 2026 Big 12 Tournament, Iowa State defeated Arizona State 91–42 in the second round, which set a new record for the largest victory in the history of the tournament. Iowa State then defeated Texas Tech 75–53 in the quarterfinals before losing to Arizona in the semifinals 82–80 on a 15-foot game-winning buzzer beater by Arizona's Jaden Bradley. The 2025-2026 Cyclones fielded the best offense of the Otzelberger era, with an adjusted offensive efficiency of 123.6 points/100 possessions. Forward Milan Momcilovic led Division I in both 3-point field goals and 3-point percentage with 136 made 3-pointers on an absurd 48.7% 3-point percentage, which led him to breaking Dedric Willoughby's school record for made 3-pointers in a season. Forward Joshua Jefferson was named a consensus All-American, making him the fifth player in Iowa State history to receive this honor, and the first since Georges Niang in 2016. The Cyclones were selected as a No. 2 seed in the NCAA tournament. Early in their first-round matchup with No. 15 Tennessee State, Jefferson suffered a sprained ankle after driving to the basket on a layup, and would miss the entire NCAA tournament. The Cyclones defeated Tennessee State 108-74 and No. 7 Kentucky 82–63 to advance to their 3rd Sweet 16 in the T.J. Otzelberger era, but would fall 76–62 to Tennessee as Tennessee took advantage of Jefferson's absence by dominating the rebounding battle. 2026 marked the last season in the career of star point guard and Ames native Tamin Lipsey, who is considered to be one of the greatest Cyclone basketball players of all time.

During the 2026 offseason, there was speculation that head coach T.J. Otzelberger could leave to take the head coaching position at North Carolina after they fired head coach Hubert Davis, but Otzelberger signed a new 10-year contract extension worth $6 million per year to stay at Iowa State. North Carolina chose to hire former NBA champion head coach Michael Malone instead.

== Head coach history ==
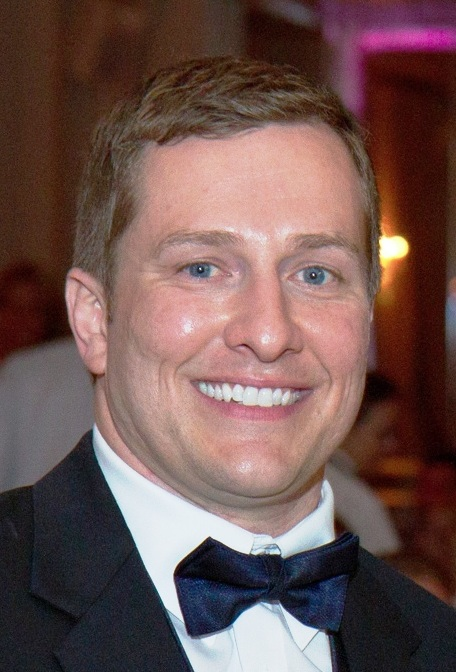
T.J. Otzelberger is the current head coach and has the highest winning percentage in school history (through the 2025–2026 season).

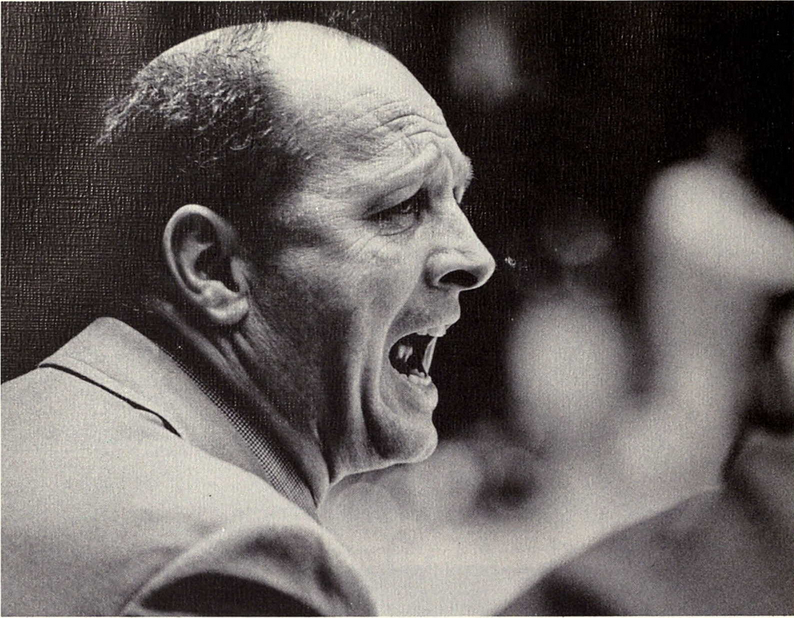
Johnny Orr is the longest-tenured and winningest coach in school history.

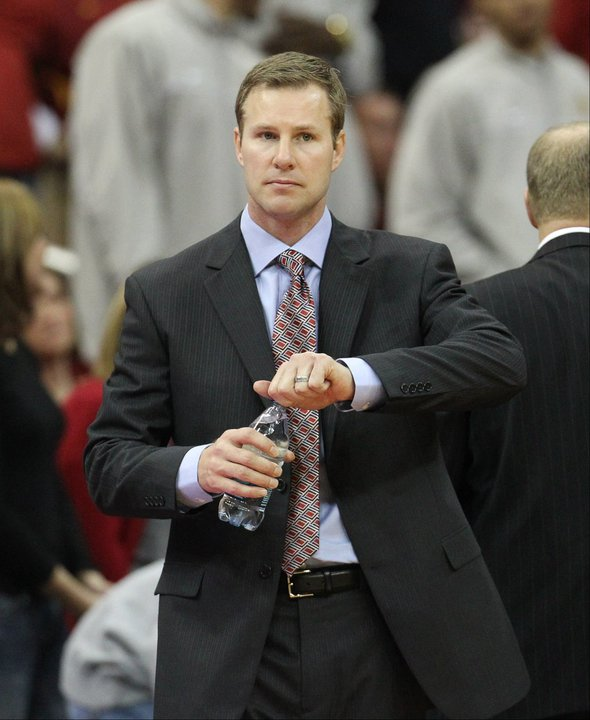
Fred Hoiberg has the second best winning percentage in school history (through the 2024–2025 season).

Head coach history
Names	Years	Record	Win pct.	Conference regular titles	NCAA appearances	NIT appearances
S. Clyde Williams	1908–11	20–29	.408	—	—	—
Homer C. Hubbard	1911–15	21–40	.344	—	—	—
H. H. Walters	1915–19	27–38	.415	—	—	—
R. N. Berryman	1919–20	6–12	.333	—	—	—
Maury Kent	1920-21	10–8	.556	—	—	—
Bill Chandler	1921–28	40–85	.320	—	—	—
Louis Menze	1928–47	166–153	.520	4	1	0
Clayton Sutherland	1947–54	63–89	.414	0	0	0
Bill Strannigan	1954–59	69–46	.600	0	0	0
Glen Anderson	1959–71	142–161	.469	0	0	0
Maury John	1971–74	43–35	.551	0	0	0
Ken Trickey	1974–76	13–40	.245	0	0	0
Lynn Nance	1976–80	44–64	.407	0	0	0
Johnny Orr	1980–94	218–200	.522	0	6	1
Tim Floyd	1994–98	81–47	.633	0	3	0
Larry Eustachy	1998–03	101–59	.631	2	2	1
Wayne Morgan	2003–06	55–39	.585	0	1	1
Greg McDermott	2006–10	59–68	.465	0	0	0
Fred Hoiberg	2010–15	115–56	.673	0	4	0
Steve Prohm	2015–21	97–95	.505	0	3	0
T. J. Otzelberger	2021–Present	124–53	.701	0	5	0
All-time totals		1514–1416	.517	6	23	3

== Season records ==
Season records
Season	Overall	Conference
1908	1–1	1–0 (North)
1909	4–10	4–4 (North)
1910	9–7	6–2 (North)
1911	6–11	6–8
1912	8–7	4–4 (North)
1913	3–13	2–4 (North)
1914	4–13	4–10 (North)
1915	6–7	5–5
1916	4–12	2–8
1917	12–6	6–4
1918	6–9	1–6
1919	5–11	3–8
1920	6–12	2–10
1921	10–8	6–8
1922	10–8	8–8
1923	9–9	8–8
1924	2–16	2–14
1925	2–15	1–15
1926	4–14	3–11
1927	9–9	5–7
1928	3–15	3–15
1929	8–7	4–6
1930	9–8	5–5
1931	8–8	4–6
1932	9–6	4–6
1933	6–10	2–8
1934	6–11	2–8
1935	13–3	8–2
1936	8–8	3–7
1937	3–15	0–10
1938	6–9	2–8

Season records
Season	Overall	Conference
1939	8–9	5–5
1940	9–9	2–8
1941	15–4	7–3
1942	11–6	5–5
1943	7–9	2–8
1944	14–4	9–1
1945	11–5	8–2
1946	8–8	5–5
1947	7–14	5–5
1948	14–9	6–6
1949	8–14	3–9
1950	6–17	2–10
1951	9–12	3–9
1952	10–11	4–8
1953	10–11	5–7
1954	6–15	2–10
1955	11–10	4–8
1956	18–5	8–4
1957	16–7	6–6
1958	15–8	8–4
1959	9–16	4–10
1960	15–9	7–7
1961	14–11	8–6
1962	13–12	8–6
1963	14–11	8–6
1964	10–16	5–9
1965	9–16	6–8
1966	11–14	6–8
1967	13–12	6–8
1968	12–13	8–6
1969	14–12	8–6

Season records
Season	Overall	Conference
1970	12–14	5–9
1971	5–21	2–12
1972	12–14	5–9
1973	16–10	7–7
1974	15–11	6–8
1975	10–16	4–10
1976	3–24	3–11
1977	8–19	3–11
1978	14–13	9–5
1979	11–16	8–6
1980	11–16	5–9
1981	9–18	2–12
1982	10–17	5–9
1983	13–15	5–9
1984	16–13	6–8
1985	21–13	7–7
1986	22–11	9–5
1987	13–15	5–9
1988	20–12	6–8
1989	17–12	7–7
1990	10–18	4–10
1991	12–19	6–8
1992	21–13	5–9
1993	20–11	8–6
1994	14–13	4–10
1995	23–11	6–8
1996	24–9	9–5
1997	22–9	10–6
1998	12–18	5–11
1999	15–15	6–10
2000	32–5	14–2

Season records
Season	Overall	Conference
2001	25–6	13–3
2002	12–19	4–12
2003	17–14	5–11
2004	20–13	7–9
2005	19–12	9–7
2006	16–14	6–10
2007	15–16	6–10
2008	14–18	4–12
2009	15–17	4–12
2010	15–17	4–12
2011	16–16	3–13
2012	23–11	12–6
2013	23–12	11–7
2014	28–8	11–7
2015	25–9	12–6
2016	23–12	10–8
2017	24–11	12–6
2018	13–18	4–14
2019	23–12	9–9
2020	12–20	5–13
2021	2–22	0–18
2022	22–13	7–11
2023	19–14	9–9
2024	29–8	13–5
2025	25–10	13–7
2026	29–7	12–6

|- | Total: | 1514–1412 | |- |

National champion Postseason invitational champion
Conference regular season champion Conference regular season and conference tournament champion
Division regular season champion Division regular season and conference tournament champion
Conference tournament champion

== Championships ==
Titles	Type	Year
Conference championships
4	Big Eight Conference regular season title	1935, 1941, 1944, 1945
2	Big Eight Conference Holiday tournament championship	1955, 1959
1	Big Eight Conference tournament championship	1996
2	Big 12 Conference regular season title	2000, 2001
6	Big 12 Conference tournament championship	2000, 2014, 2015, 2017, 2019, 2024
15 total

== All-time records ==
=== Record vs. Big 12 opponents ===
==== Current Big 12 opponents ====
Current Big 12 opponents
Iowa State vs.	Overall record	in Ames	at opponent's venue	at neutral site	Last 5 meetings	Last 10 meetings	Current streak	As Big 12 opponent
Arizona	UA, 7–4	ISU, 3–0	UA, 4–1	UA, 3–0	UA, 4–1	UA, 6–4	L 2	UA, 3–1
Arizona State	ISU, 5–1	ISU, 3–0	tied, 1–1	ISU, 1–0	ISU, 4–1	ISU 5–1	W 4	ISU, 3–0
Baylor	ISU, 26–25	ISU, 16–6	BU, 18–4	ISU, 6–1	ISU, 4–1	ISU, 6–4	W 3	ISU, 25–24
BYU	ISU, 7–4	ISU, 4–1	tied, 2–2	tied, 1–1	BYU, 3–2	ISU, 6–4	L 3	BYU, 4–1
Cincinnati	tied, 5–5	tied, 1–1	ISU, 2–1	UC, 3–2	ISU, 3–2	tied, 5–5	L 1	ISU, 3–1
Colorado	ISU, 82–70	ISU, 49–18	CU, 48–18	ISU, 15–4	ISU, 5–0	ISU, 7–3	W 5	ISU,19-16
Kansas	KU, 192–70	KU, 74–44	KU, 99–16	KU, 19–10	ISU, 3–2	KU, 6–4	W 1	KU, 47–19
Kansas State	KSU, 147–96	ISU, 56–55	KSU, 85–28	ISU, 12–7	ISU, 3–2	ISU 6–4	W 2	ISU, 33–30
Houston	ISU, 6-5	ISU, 4–1	UH, 3–1	tied, 1–1	ISU, 3–2	tied, 5–5	W 1	ISU, 3–2
Oklahoma State	OSU, 73–70	ISU, 43–18	OSU, 42–20	OSU, 13–7	ISU, 3–2	OSU, 6–4	W 2	OSU, 27–23
Utah	ISU, 3–2	ISU, 2–0	ISU, 1–0	UU, 0–2	ISU, 3–2	ISU, 3–2	W 2	ISU, 2–0
TCU	ISU, 18–15	ISU, 10–5	TCU, 7–8	TCU, 2–1	ISU, 4–1	ISU, 6–4	L 1	ISU, 17–10
Texas Tech	ISU, 25–23	ISU, 16–7	TTU, 14–7	tied, 2–2	ISU, 3–2	tied, 5–5	W 1	tied, 23–23
UCF	ISU, 4–0	ISU, 2–0	ISU, 2–0	tied, 0–0	ISU, 4–0	ISU, 4–0	W 4	ISU, 4–0
West Virginia	WVU, 15–11	ISU, 8–5	WVU, 10–2	ISU, 1–0	WVU, 3–2	WVU, 7–3	W 1	WVU, 15–10
*As of March 23, 2026

==== Former Big 12 opponents ====
Former Big 12 opponents
Iowa State vs.	Overall record	in Ames	at opponent's venue	at neutral site	Last 5 meetings	Last 10 meetings	Current streak
Missouri	MU, 151–86	ISU, 59–51	MU, 84–22	MU, 5–16	MU, 3–2	MU, 8–2	L 1
Nebraska	NU, 132–102	ISU, 65–49	NU, 78–29	ISU, 8–5	ISU, 3–2	ISU, 7–3	W 1
Oklahoma	OU, 123–94	ISU, 56–40	OU, 67–26	OU, 16–12	ISU, 3–2	OU, 7–3	W 1
Texas	UT, 28–21	ISU, 15–6	UT, 19–3	Tied, 3–3	ISU, 3–2	UT, 6–4	W 1
Texas A&M	TAMU, 12–9	tied, 4–4	TAMU, 6–4	TAMU, 2–1	TAMU, 3–2	TAMU, 8–2	L 2
*As of December 9, 2024.

=== Record versus Iowa schools ===
Records vs Iowa schools as of December 15, 2025.

Record versus Iowa schools
Rival	Record (W-L)	Win %
Camp Dodge	1–1	.500
Coe College	11–3	.786
Cornell College	8–2	.800
Dubuque	1–0	1.000
Drake	110–65	.629
Fort Dodge	1–0	1.000
Fort Dodge YMCA	1–0	1.000
Grinnell College	32–20	.615

Record versus Iowa Schools
Rival	Record (W-L)	Win %
Iowa	31–48	.392
Iowa Pre-Flight	2–3	.400
Loras College	1–0	1.000
Luther College	1–0	1.000
Morningside College	7–0	1.000
Northern Iowa	37–13	.740
Ottumwa Naval	2–3	.400
Simpson College	16–1	.941

=== Postseason tournament history ===
Iowa State has appeared in the NCAA Tournament 24 times, with a current record of 26–24.

NCAA Tournament history
Season	Seed	Eliminated round	Teams defeated	Defeated by
1944	–	Final Four	Pepperdine	Utah
1985	(13)	1st Round	–	(4) Ohio State
1986	(7)	Sweet 16	(10) Miami (Ohio) (2) Michigan	(6) North Carolina State
1988	(12)	1st Round	–	(5) Georgia Tech
1989	(10)	1st Round	–	(7) UCLA
1992	(10)	2nd Round	(7) UNC Charlotte	(2) Kentucky
1993	(8)	1st Round	–	(9) UCLA
1995	(7)	2nd Round	(10) Florida	(2) North Carolina
1996	(5)	2nd Round	(12) California	(4) Utah
1997	(6)	Sweet 16	(11) Illinois State (3) Cincinnati	(2) UCLA
2000	(2)	Elite Eight	(15) Central Connecticut State (7) Auburn (6) UCLA	(1) Michigan State
2001	(2)	1st Round	–	(15) Hampton
2005	(9)	2nd Round	(8) Minnesota	(1) North Carolina
2012	(8)	2nd Round	(9) Connecticut	(1) Kentucky
2013	(10)	2nd Round	(7) Notre Dame	(2) Ohio State
2014	(3)	Sweet 16	(14) North Carolina Central (6) North Carolina	(7) Connecticut
2015	(3)	1st Round	–	(14) UAB
2016	(4)	Sweet 16	(13) Iona (12) Arkansas-Little Rock	(1) Virginia
2017	(5)	2nd Round	(12) Nevada	(4) Purdue
2019	(6)	1st Round	–	(11) Ohio State
2022	(11)	Sweet 16	(6) LSU (3) Wisconsin	(10) Miami (FL)
2023	(6)	1st Round	–	(11) Pittsburgh
2024	(2)	Sweet 16	(15) South Dakota State (7) Washington State	(3) Illinois
2025	(3)	2nd Round	(14) Lipscomb	(6) Ole Miss
2026	(2)	Sweet 16	(15) Tennessee State (7) Kentucky	(6) Tennessee
NCAA Tournament record: 26–24

=== NIT results ===
Iowa State has appeared in the National Invitational Tournament three times. The Cyclones have a record of 4–3.

Year	Round	Opponent	Result
1984	First Round	Marquette	L 53–73
2003	Opening Round; First Round	Wichita State; Iowa	W 76–65; L 53–54
2004	First Round; Second Round; Quarterfinals; Semifinals	Georgia; Florida State; Marquette; Rutgers	W 82–74; W 62–59; W 77–69; L 81–84

=== Seeds ===
==== NCAA tournament ====
Years →	1944	1985	1986	1988	1989	1992	1993	1995	1996	1997	2000	2001	2005	2012	2013	2014	2015	2016	2017	2019
Seeds→	-	13	7	12	10	10	8	7	5	6	2	2	9	8	10	3	3	4	5	6

Years →	2022	2023	2024	2025	2026
Seeds→	11	6	2	3	2

== Pageantry and traditions ==
=== Team name ===
The original "Cyclone" football team first played during 1895. This team earned the nickname "Cyclones" when they soundly defeated Northwestern, 36–0. The Chicago Tribune the next day headlined the story about the game "STRUCK BY A CYCLONE — It Comes From Iowa and Devastates Evanston Town." Since then, the name Cyclones has been associated with Iowa State.

=== Mascot ===
Borrowing from one of its school colors, Iowa State uses a cardinal, Cy, as its mascot instead of an actual tornado or cyclone. Prior to the football match-up against Colorado on November 12, 2005, a tornado touched down in several places in and around Ames, Iowa, forcing fans to either weather the storm outside in the parking lot or seek shelter in the adjacent Bergstrom Indoor Training Facility or nearby Hilton Coliseum. Such an atmosphere was created that Iowa State was able to beat the favored Buffaloes, 30–16. When asked about the event, Colorado coach Gary Barnett said, "I thought we had a pretty good mascot. But when we showed up at Iowa State and they had a real tornado, that's the real deal."

=== Rivalries ===
==== State of Kansas ====
Iowa State's biggest conference rival is the Kansas Jayhawks. The Jayhawks have been very successful under head coach Bill Self, heightening the magnitude of the rivalry. Kansas leads the all-time series 192–70. Many Iowa State fans in the student section have been known to chant "F--k KU" during Iowa State-Kansas basketball games at Hilton Coliseum, especially during instrumental interludes in The Killers' song "Mr. Brightside," which is frequently played at Iowa State home games.

The Kansas State Wildcats are also a top conference rival in basketball, although their rivalry with the Cyclones is more prominent in college football. Kansas State leads the all-time series 147–96.

==== Iowa ====
Iowa State's biggest non-conference rival is the Cyclone's in-state rival the Iowa Hawkeyes. This rivalry game counts toward the Iowa Corn Cy-Hawk Series that encompasses all athletic competitions between Iowa and Iowa State. The series began in 1909–10, but it was suspended between 1935 and 1970. As of the 2024–25 season, Iowa leads the all-time basketball series 48–30.

=== Hy-Vee Classic ===
In the Hy-Vee Classic, which ran from 2012 to 2018, Iowa State played in-state rivals from the Missouri Valley Conference at Wells Fargo Arena in Des Moines, on an alternating basis each December: Drake in even years and Northern Iowa in odd years.

As of the 2018–19 season, Iowa State had a 38–13 lead in the all-time series against Northern Iowa (going 2–1 in Hy-Vee Classic games). Also as of that season, Iowa State had a 110–65 all-time series lead over Drake (going 4–0 in Hy-Vee Classic games).

== Facilities ==
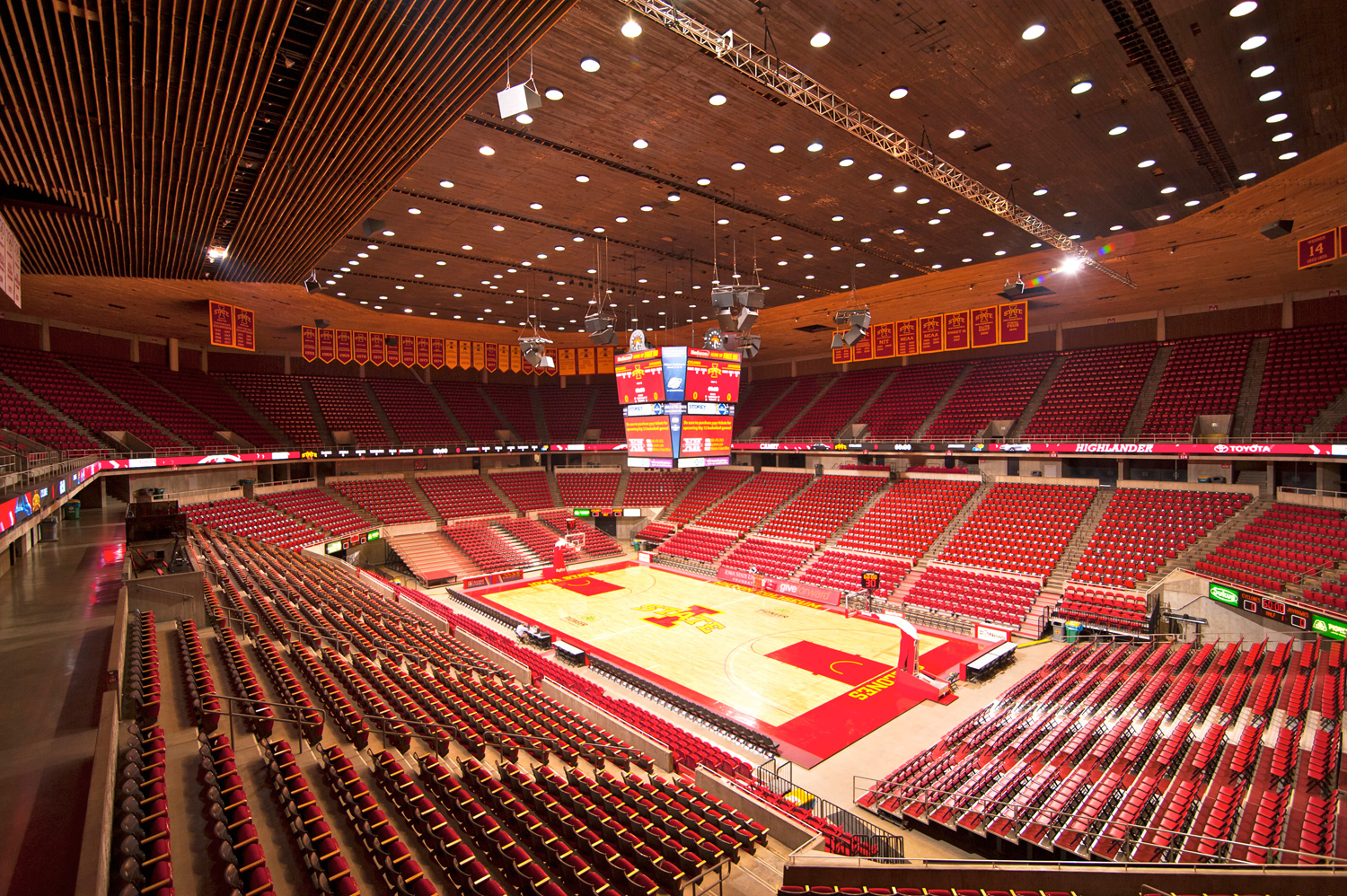
Hilton Coliseum

Hilton Coliseum

James H. Hilton Coliseum is a 14,384-seat multi-purpose arena in Ames, Iowa. The arena, which is part of the Iowa State Center, opened in 1971. It is home to the Iowa State Cyclones basketball, wrestling, gymnastics, and volleyball teams. The building was specifically built to hold in sound with a solid concrete structure, steel doors, and a crowd that sits just a few feet from the court. During big games, players from opposing teams, as well as Iowa State, have even said that the floor has shaken due to the loudness of the crowd. A record basketball crowd of 15,000 saw the Cyclones post a 97–94 win over Iowa in 1971.

"Hilton Magic" is the atmosphere created by the fans at Hilton Coliseum during men's and women's basketball games. The now famous moniker for Iowa State's home basketball facility was coined by Des Moines Register writer Buck Turnbull on February 14, 1989, after the Cyclones (with Johnny Orr as coach) stunned third-ranked Missouri, 82–75. The morning newspaper included a headline that read "Hilton Magic Spells 'Upset' One More Time." In the article, Turnbull called for more Hilton Magic in an upcoming game with Oklahoma State. Cyclone fans responded and ISU defeated the Cowboys, 90–81, and a nickname was born.

According to many sources, Hilton Coliseum is considered one of the toughest venues to play in the nation.

Sukup Basketball Complex

Opened in September 2009, Iowa State's new basketball practice facility is located on two acres of land (in west Ames) that was donated by a local developer, Dickson Jensen. The $8 million, 36,000-square-foot (3,300 m^{2}) facility, includes two separate 10,000-square-foot gymnasiums for both the men's and women's basketball programs, as well as separate lounges and locker rooms, a theater room, a medical treatment area, and coaches' offices and conference rooms.

Hixson-Lied Student Success Center

The $10 million Hixson-Lied Student Success Center was designed for improving academic achievement campus-wide, with the second floor devoted specifically to student athletes. The facility was built using private contributions. Since its completion in 2006, Iowa State student athletes have dramatically improved in the classroom and now have a higher average grade point average than the rest of the student body.

== Roster ==
2025–26 Iowa State Cyclones men's basketball team
Players
Coaches

Pos.	#	Name	Height	Weight	Year	Previous school	Hometown
G	0	Nate Heise	6 ft 5 in (1.96 m)	212 lb (96 kg)	RS Sr	Northern Iowa	Lake City, MN
F	32	Eric Mulder	6 ft 8 in (2.03 m)	225 lb (102 kg)	Sr	Pella Christian	Oskaloosa, IA
F	2	Joshua Jefferson	6 ft 9 in (2.06 m)	240 lb (109 kg)	Sr	Henderson	Henderson, NV
G	3	Tamin Lipsey	6 ft 1 in (1.85 m)	200 lb (91 kg)	Sr	Ames High School	Ames, IA
C	23	Blake Buchanan	6 ft 11 in (2.11 m)	235 lb (107 kg)	Jr	Lake City	Couer d'Alene, ID
G	27	Killyan Toure	6 ft 3 in (1.91 m)	205 lb (93 kg)	Fr	Brewster Academy	Pamiers, France
G	1	Jamarion Batemon	6 ft 3 in (1.91 m)	195 lb (88 kg)	Fr	Milwaukee Academy of Science	Milwaukee, WI
C	21	Dominykas Pleta	6 ft 11 in (2.11 m)	240 lb (109 kg)	Fr	MHP Riesen Ludwigsberg	Gotha, Germany
G	13	Cade Kelderman	6 ft 1 in (1.85 m)	185 lb (84 kg)	Jr	Waukee Northwest	Waukee, IA
G	11	Dominick Nelson	6 ft 5 in (1.96 m)	180 lb (82 kg)	Sr	Liberty Heights Athletic Institute	Miami, FL
F	22	Milan Momcilovic	6 ft 8 in (2.03 m)	225 lb (102 kg)	Jr	Pewaukee	Pewaukee, WI
G	55	Xzavion Mitchell	6 ft 6 in (1.98 m)	215 lb (98 kg)	Fr	Oshkosh North	Oshkosh, WI
G	7	Anthony Rise (W)	6 ft 0 in (1.83 m)	174 lb (79 kg)	Fr	Brookfield Central	Milwaukee, WI
G	2	Mason Williams	6 ft 5 in (1.96 m)	170 lb (77 kg)	Jr	O'Dea	Seattle, WA

Head coach

- T. J. Otzelberger (UW–Whitewater)

Assistant coach(es)

- Kyle Green (Hamline)
- J.R. Blount (Loyola Chicago)
- Nate Schmidt (Denison)
- Erik Crawford (Northern Iowa)
- Diante Garrett (Iowa State)

Legend

- (C) Team captain
- (S) Suspended
- (I) Ineligible
- (W) Walk-on
- Injured
- Current redshirt

Roster

== NBA draft ==
As of the conclusion of the 2020 NBA draft, 41 Cyclone players had been selected in the NBA draft in the history of the program. Of these, ten players were selected in the first round, and eleven were selected in the second round.

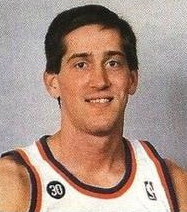
Jeff Hornacek

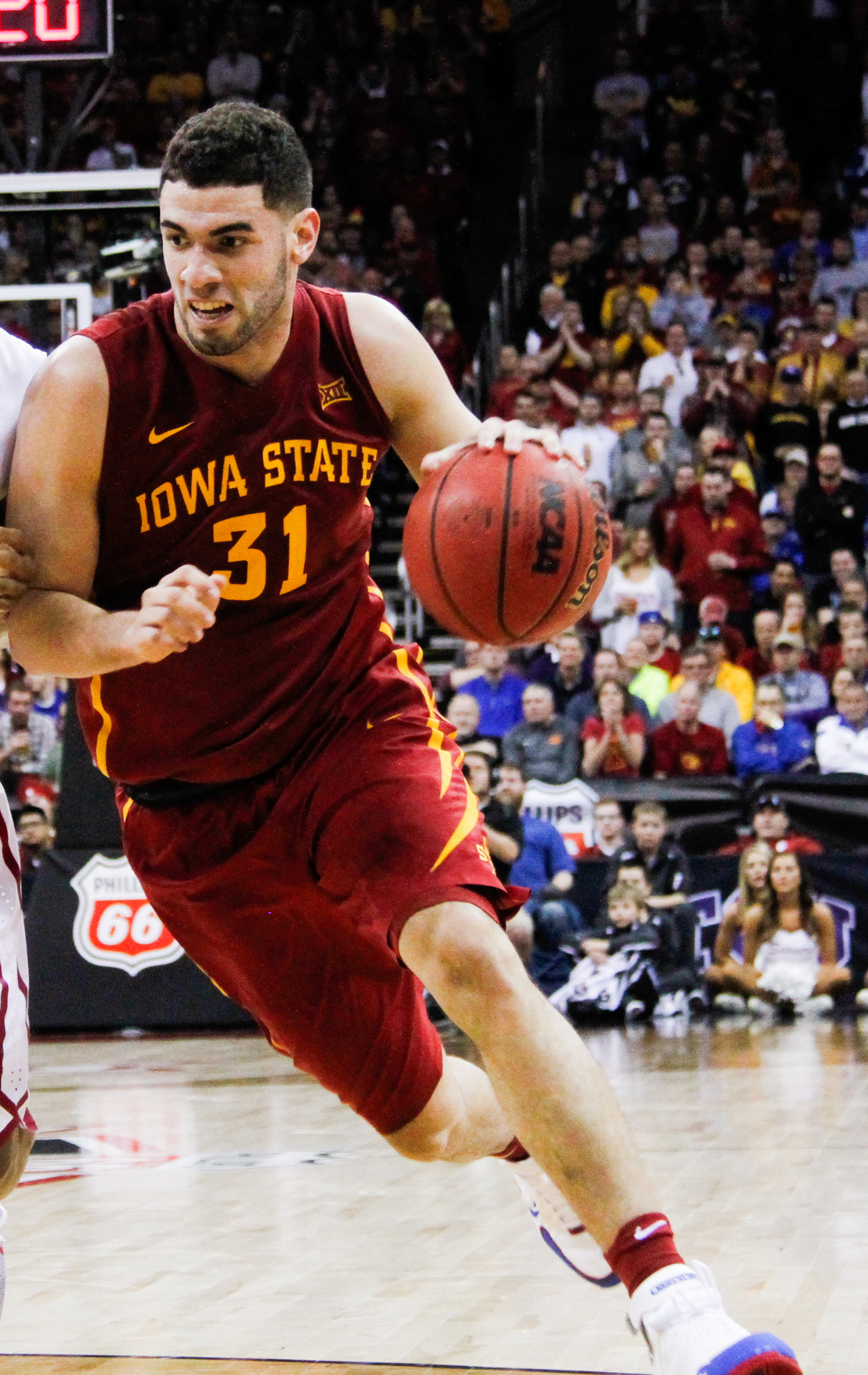
Georges Niang

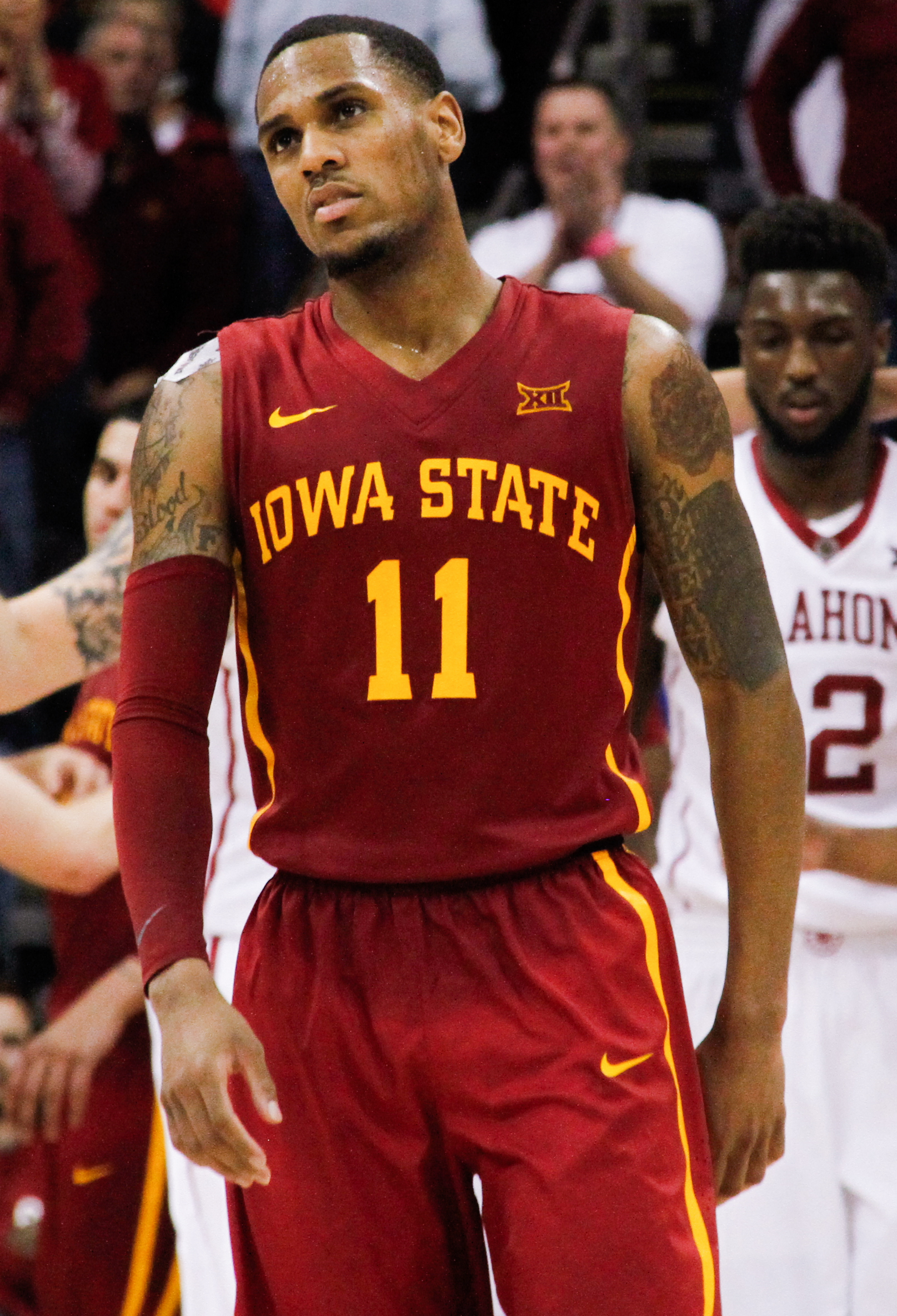
Monté Morris

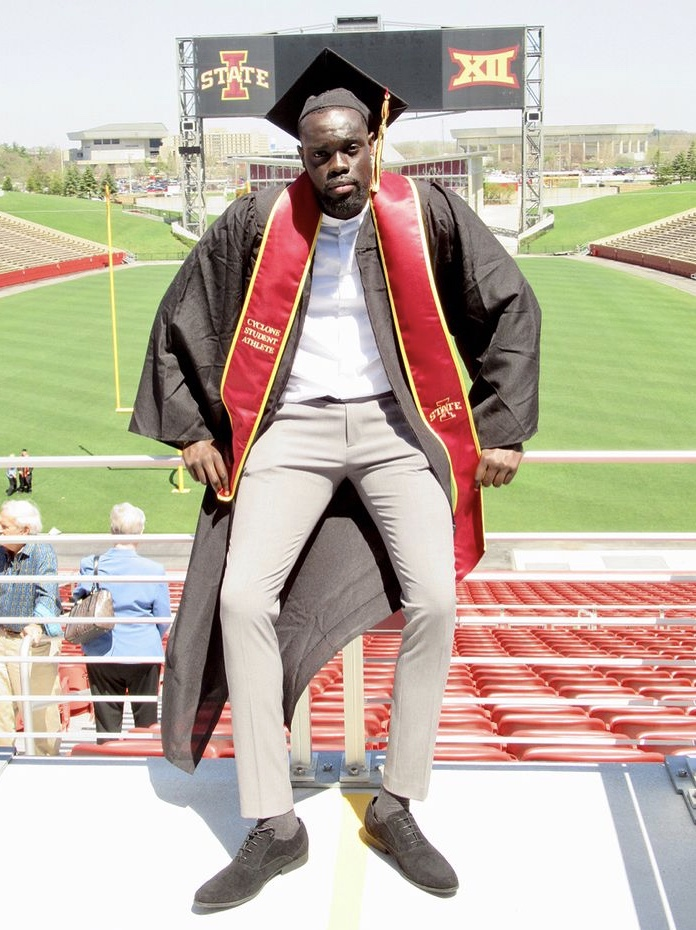
Marial Shayok

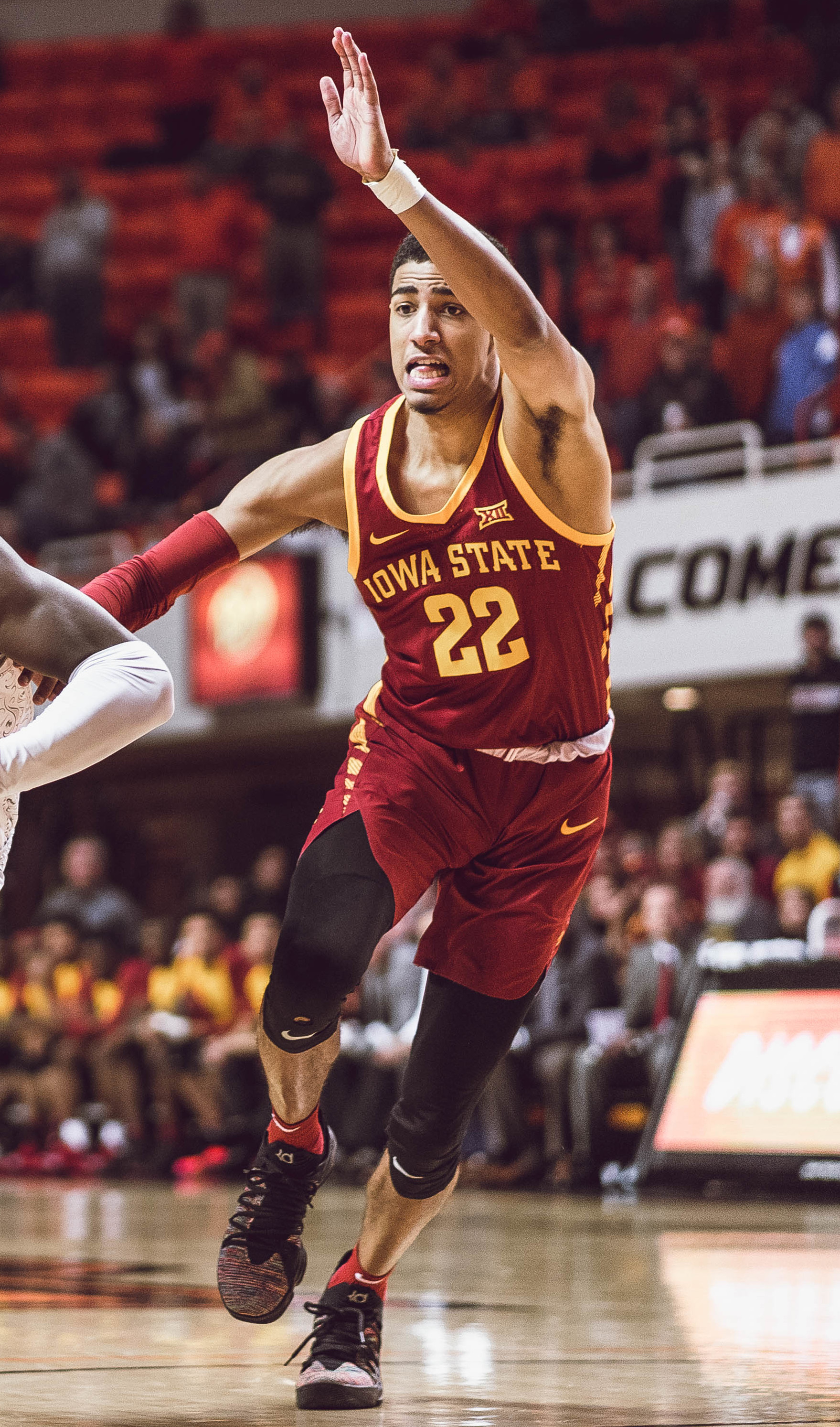
Tyrese Haliburton

NBA draft
Year	Round	Pick	Overall	Player	Team
1948	N/A	N/A	N/A	Ray Wehde	Boston Celtics
1953	N/A	N/A	N/A	Delmar Diercks	New York Knicks
1957	5	3	35	Gary Thompson	Minneapolis Lakers
1958	12	2	79	Don Medsker	Cincinnati Royals
1961	4	5	37	Henry Whitney	Syracuse Nationals
1962	9	5	74	Vince Brewer	Syracuse Nationals
1963	11	2	77	Marv Straw	St. Louis Hawks
1968	1	5	5	Zaid Abdul-Aziz	Cincinnati Royals
1968	11	3	137	John McGonigle	Chicago Bulls
1970	3	8	42	Bill Cain	Portland Trail Blazers
1973	3	17	52	Martinez Denmon	Boston Celtics
1973	5	8	77	Clint Harris	Phoenix Suns
1973	16	3	201	Tom O'Connor	Cleveland Cavaliers
1974	3	5	41	Robert Wilson	Houston Rockets
1976	4	10	61	Hercle Ivy	Houston Rockets
1976	10	7	165	Art Johnson	New Orleans Jazz
1979	3	2	46	Andrew Parker	Washington Bullets
1980	6	14	129	Dean Uthoff	San Antonio Spurs
1982	10	5	210	Robert Estes	Kansas City Kings
1985	2	19	43	Barry Stevens	Denver Nuggets
1986	2	22	46	Jeff Hornacek	Phoenix Suns
1987	3	8	54	Tom Schafer	Denver Nuggets
1987	5	20	112	Sam Hill	Dallas Mavericks
1988	1	13	13	Jeff Grayer	Milwaukee Bucks
1991	1	17	17	Victor Alexander	Golden State Warriors
1995	1	24	24	Loren Meyer	Dallas Mavericks
1995	2	23	52	Fred Hoiberg	Indiana Pacers
1997	1	15	15	Kelvin Cato	Dallas Mavericks
2000	1	4	4	Marcus Fizer	Chicago Bulls
2001	1	27	27	Jamaal Tinsley	Vancouver Grizzlies
2004	2	2	31	Jackson Vroman	Chicago Bulls
2006	2	30	60	Will Blalock	Detroit Pistons
2008	2	25	55	Mike Taylor	Portland Trail Blazers
2010	1	21	21	Craig Brackins	Oklahoma City Thunder
2012	1	16	16	Royce White	Houston Rockets
2016	2	20	50	Georges Niang	Indiana Pacers
2016	2	28	58	Abdel Nader	Boston Celtics
2017	2	21	51	Monté Morris	Denver Nuggets
2019	2	16	46	Talen Horton-Tucker	Orlando Magic
2019	2	24	54	Marial Shayok	Philadelphia 76ers
2020	1	12	12	Tyrese Haliburton	Sacramento Kings

== Individual accomplishments ==
=== All-Time Cyclone scoring leaders ===
Points leaders
Player	Years	Points	PPG
Jeff Grayer	1984–85 1985–86 1986–87 1987–88	2,502	20.0
Georges Niang	2012–13 2013–14 2014–15 2015–16	2,228	16.1
Barry Stevens	1981–82 1982–83 1983–84 1984–85	2,190	18.7
Fred Hoiberg	1991–92 1992–93 1993–94 1994–95	1,993	15.8
Victor Alexander	1987–88 1988–89 1989–90 1990–91	1,892	17.1

=== All-Time Cyclone rebounding leaders ===
Rebounds leaders
Player	Years	Rebounds	RPG
Dean Uthoff	1977–78 1978–79 1979–80	1,233	11.4
Melvin Ejim	2010–11 2011–12 2012–13 2013–2014	1,051	7.8
Zaid Abdul-Aziz	1966–67 1967–68	1,025	13.7
Bill Cain	1968–69 1969–70	957	12.4
Jeff Grayer	1985–86 1986–87 1987–88	910	7.2

=== All-Time Cyclone assist leaders ===
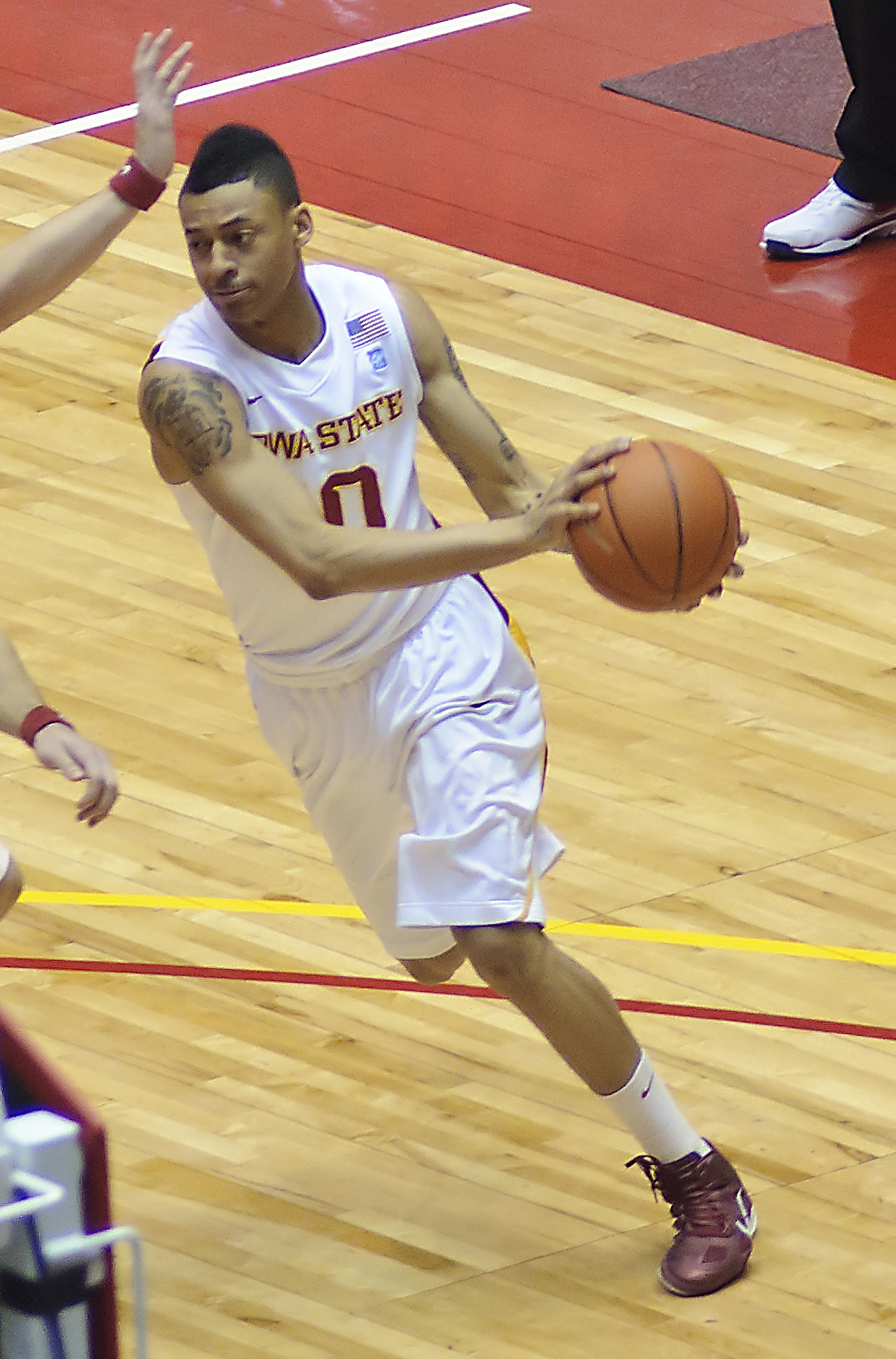
Diante Garrett

Assists leaders
Player	Years	Assists	APG
Monté Morris	2013–14 2014–15 2015–16 2016–17	765	5.5
Jeff Hornacek	1983–84 1984–85 1985–86	665	5.4
Diante Garrett	2007–08 2008–09 2009–10 2010–11	611	4.8
Tamin Lipsey	2022-23 2023-24 2024-25 2025–26	602	4.4
Gary Thompkins	1985–86 1986–87 1987–88	600	5.0

=== Cyclone All-Americans ===
All-Americans
Year	Player	Type
1935	Jack Flemming	Third Team All-American
1937	Waldo Wegner	Second Team All-American
1957	Gary Thompson	Consensus Second Team All-American
1968	Zaid Abdul-Aziz	Third Team All-American
1978	Dean Uthoff; Andrew Parker	Honorable Mention All-American; Honorable Mention All-American
1984	Barry Stevens	Honorable Mention All-American
1985	Barry Stevens	Honorable Mention All-American
1986	Jeff Hornacek; Jeff Grayer	Honorable Mention All-American; Honorable Mention All-American
1987	Jeff Grayer	Honorable Mention All-American
1988	Jeff Grayer	Second Team All-American
1995	Fred Hoiberg	Honorable Mention All-American
1996	Dedric Willoughby	Honorable Mention All-American
1997	Dedric Willoughby	Honorable Mention All-American
2000	Marcus Fizer	Consensus First Team All-American
2001	Jamaal Tinsley	Consensus Second Team All-American
2005	Curtis Stinson	Honorable Mention All-American
2009	Craig Brackins	Honorable Mention All-American
2012	Royce White	Honorable Mention All-American
2014	Melvin Ejim; DeAndre Kane	Second Team All-American; Third Team All-American
2015	Georges Niang	Third Team All-American
2016	Georges Niang	Consensus Second Team All-American
2017	Monté Morris	Third Team All-American
2019	Marial Shayok	Honorable Mention All-American
2024	Tamin Lipsey	Honorable Mention All-American
2025	Curtis Jones	Honorable Mention All-American
2026	Joshua Jefferson	Consensus Second Team All-American

=== First Team All-Conference selections ===
First Team All-Conference
Season	Conference	Player	Position
1910–11	MVIAA	Joe Brown	F
1912–13	MVIAA	Hans Pfund	C
1922–23	MVIAA	Pinky Greene	F
1928–29	Big Six	Lester Lande	F
1930–31	Big Six	Jack Roadcap	F
1933–34; 1934–35	Big Six	Waldo Wegner	F
1936–37	Big Six	Jack Flemming	F
1937–38	Big Six	Bob Blahnik	F
1938–39	Big Six	Bob Harris	F
1940–41	Big Six	Al Budolfson; Gordan Nicholas	F C
1941–42	Big Six	Al Budolfson; Carol Schneider	G G
1943–44	Big Six	Ray Wehde; Price Brookfield	F C
1944–45	Big Six	Bob Mott; Bill Block	C F
1945–46	Big Six	Bob Peterson	G
1946–47	Big Six	Ray Wehde	F
1951–52	Big Seven	Jim Stange	F
1952–53	Big Seven	Delmar Diercks	C
1955–56; 1956–57	Big Seven	Gary Thompson	G
1957–58	Big Eight	John Crawford	F
1960–61	Big Eight	Henry Whitney	G
1962–63	Big Eight	Marv Straw	G
1964–65	Big Eight	Al Koch	F
1965–66; 1966–67; 1967–68	Big Eight	Zaid Abdul-Aziz	C

First Team All-Conference
Season	Conference	Player	Position
1968–69; 1969–70	Big Eight	Bill Cain	C
1974–75	Big Eight	Hercle Ivy	G
1977–78	Big Eight	Dean Uthoff	C
1978–79	Big Eight	Andrew Parker	F
1983–84; 1984–85	Big Eight	Barry Stevens	F
1985–86	Big Eight	Jeff Grayer; Jeff Hornacek	F G
1986–87; 1987–88	Big Eight	Jeff Grayer	F
1988–89	Big Eight	Victor Alexander	C
1990–91	Big Eight	Victor Alexander	C
1992–93	Big Eight	Justus Thigpen	G
1994–95	Big Eight	Fred Hoiberg	G
1995–96; 1996–97	Big Eight	Dedric Willoughby	G
1998–99	Big 12	Marcus Fizer	F
1999-00	Big 12	Marcus Fizer; Jamaal Tinsley	F G
2000–01	Big 12	Jamaal Tinsley	G
2005–06	Big 12	Curtis Stinson	G
2008–09	Big 12	Craig Brackins	F
2011–12	Big 12	Royce White	F
2013–14	Big 12	Melvin Ejim; DeAndre Kane	F G
2014–15; 2015–16	Big 12	Georges Niang	F
2016–17	Big 12	Monté Morris	G
2018–19	Big 12	Marial Shayok	G
2021–22	Big 12	Izaiah Brockington	G
2023–24	Big 12	Tamin Lipsey	G
2024-25	Big 12	Curtis Jones	G
2025-26	Big 12	Joshua Jefferson	F

=== Retired numbers ===
Iowa State has retired seven numbers to date:

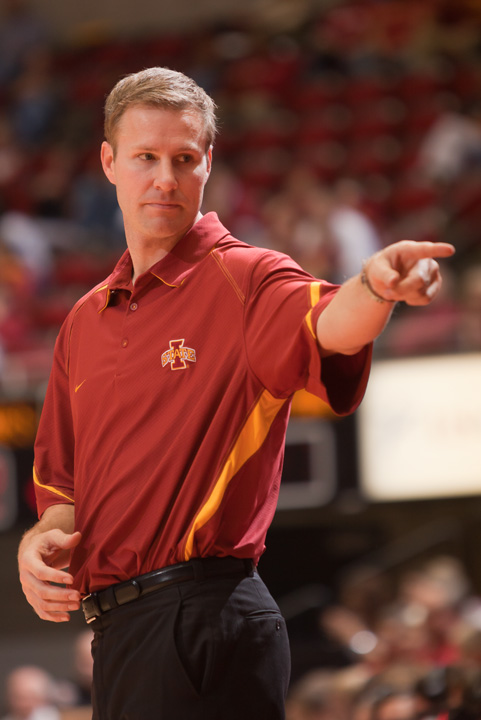
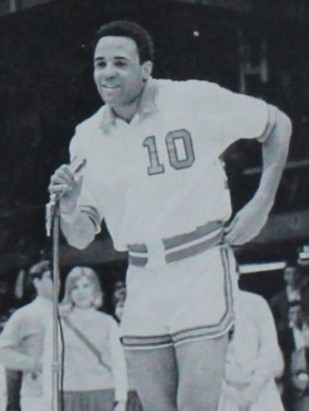
Fltr: Fred Hoiberg, and Zaid_Abdul Aziz, whose numbers were retired by Iowa State

Iowa State Cyclones retired numbers
No.	Player	Position	Career	No.ret.	Ref.
14	Jeff Hornacek	SG / PG	1982–1986	1991	
14	Waldo Wegner	C	1932–1935	1992	
20	Gary Thompson	G	1954–1957	1957	
32	Fred Hoiberg	SG	1991–1995	1997	
35	Zaid Abdul-Aziz	PF / C	1965–1968	1968	
35	Barry Stevens	SG / SF	1981–1985	2008	
44	Jeff Grayer	SF / SG	1984–1988	1988	

== See also ==
- Iowa State Cyclones women's basketball
