= 1913–14 Indiana Hoosiers men's basketball team =

American college basketball season

1913–14 Indiana Hoosiers men's basketball
- Conference: Big Ten Conference
- Record: 2–12 (1–11 Western)
- Head coach: Arthur Berndt (1st season)
- Captain: Frank Whitaker
- Home arena: Old Assembly Hall

1913–14 Western Conference men's basketball standings
	Conf.				Overall
Team	W		L	PCT	W		L	PCT
Wisconsin	12	–	0	1.000	15	–	0	1.000
Ohio State	5	–	1	.833	11	–	4	.733
Chicago	8	–	4	.667	19	–	9	.679
Illinois	7	–	3	.700	9	–	4	.692
Northwestern	5	–	5	.500	11	–	6	.647
Minnesota	4	–	8	.333	4	–	11	.267
Purdue	3	–	9	.250	5	–	9	.357
Iowa	1	–	5	.167	9	–	7	.563
Indiana	1	–	11	.083	2	–	12	.143

The 1913–14 Indiana Hoosiers men's basketball team represented Indiana University. Their head coach was Arthur Berndt, who was in his 1st year. The team played its home games at the Old Assembly Hall in Bloomington, Indiana, and was a member of the Western Conference.

The Hoosiers finished the regular season with an overall record of 2–12 and a conference record of 1–11, finishing 9th in the Western Conference.

== Roster ==
Name	Position	Year	Hometown
William Ferguson	G	N/A	Gaston, Indiana
James Frenzel	F	So.	Indianapolis, Indiana
Ward Gilbert	C	N/A	Russiaville, Indiana
Russell Kirkpatrick	G	So.	Rushville, Indiana
Byron Lingeman	G	N/A	Brownsburg, Indiana
Allen Maxwell	F	So.	Indianapolis, Indiana
Clinton Prather	F	So.	Wheatland, Indiana
Frank Pruitt	G	N/A	Coatesville, Indiana
Frank Whitaker	G	So.	South Bend, Indiana

== Schedule/results ==
Date time, TV	Rank^{#}	Opponent^{#}	Result	Record	Site city, state
Regular season
1/6/1914		at Illinois; Rivalry	L 6–35	0–1 (0–1)	Kenney Gym; Urbana, IL
1/12/1914		Wisconsin	L 15–59	0–2 (0–2)	Old Assembly Hall; Bloomington, IN
1/17/1914		at Northwestern	L 33–48	0–3 (0–3)	Old Patten Gymnasium; Evanston, IL
1/24/1914*		Earlham	L 11–19	0–4 (0–3)	Old Assembly Hall; Bloomington, IN
1/30/1914*		at Earlham	W 28–25	1–4 (0–3)	Richmond, IN
1/31/1914		at Ohio State	L 17–43	1–5 (0–4)	Columbus, OH
2/7/1914		Illinois; Rivalry	L 15–31	1–6 (0–5)	Old Assembly Hall; Bloomington, IN
2/9/1914		at Purdue; Rivalry	L 13–35	1–7 (0–6)	Memorial Gymnasium; West Lafayette, IN
2/13/1914		Northwestern	L 16–40	1–8 (0–7)	Old Assembly Hall; Bloomington, IN
2/23/1914		at Minnesota	L 23–26	1–9 (0–8)	UM Armory; Minneapolis, MN
2/24/1914		at Wisconsin	L 24–46	1–10 (0–9)	Red Gym; Madison, WI
2/28/1914		Ohio State	L 19–28	1–11 (0–10)	Old Assembly Hall; Bloomington, IN
3/3/1914		Purdue; Rivalry	W 30–28	2–11 (1–10)	Old Assembly Hall; Bloomington, IN
3/7/1914		Minnesota	L 8–28	2–12 (1–11)	Old Assembly Hall; Bloomington, IN
*Non-conference game. ^{#}Rankings from AP Poll. (#) Tournament seedings in parentheses.
