= 1913–14 Missouri Tigers men's basketball team =

American college basketball season

1913–14 Missouri Tigers men's basketball
- Conference: Big Eight Conference
- Record: 4–12 (4–12 MVIAA)
- Head coach: O.F. Field
- Home arena: Rothwell Gymnasium

The 1913–14 Missouri Tigers men's basketball team represented University of Missouri in the 1913–14 college basketball season. The team was led by third year head coach O.F. Field. The captain of the team was Milton Bernet.

Missouri finished with a 4–12 record overall and a 4–12 record in the Missouri Valley Intercollegiate Athletic Association. This was good enough for a 4th-place finish in the regular season conference standings.

== Schedule and results ==
Date time, TV	Rank^{#}	Opponent^{#}	Result	Record	Site city, state
January 12		Iowa State	W 32–19	1–0 (1–0)	Columbia, Missouri
January 13		Iowa State	W 37–9	2–0 (2–0)	Columbia, Missouri
February 4		Washington (MO)	W 28–20	3–0 (3–0)	Columbia, Missouri
February 5		Washington (MO)	L 15–23	3–1 (3–1)	Columbia, Missouri
February 11		Kansas	L 25–28	3–2 (3–2)	Columbia, Missouri
February 12		Kansas	L 21–27	3–3 (3–3)	Columbia, Missouri
February 13		at Iowa State	L 20–23	3–4 (3–4)	Ames, Iowa
February 14		at Iowa State	W 23–16	4–4 (4–4)	Ames, Iowa
February 18		Kansas State	L 32–35	4–5 (4–5)	Columbia, Missouri
February 19		Kansas State	L 21–22	4–6 (4–6)	Columbia, Missouri
February 25		at Kansas	L 22–38	4–7 (4–7)	Lawrence, Kansas
February 26		at Kansas	L 18–31	4–8 (4–8)	Lawrence, Kansas
February 27		at Kansas State	L 20–32	4–9 (4–9)	Manhattan, Kansas
February 28		at Kansas State	L 23–24	4–10 (4–10)	Manhattan, Kansas
March 2		at Washington (MO)	L 17–27	4–11 (4–11)	St. Louis, Missouri
March 3		at Washington (MO)	L 19–27	4–12 (4–12)	St. Louis, Missouri
*Non-conference game. ^{#}Rankings from Coaches' Poll. (#) Tournament seedings in parentheses. All times are in Central Standard Time.
