= 1964–65 NCAA University Division men's basketball season =

Men's collegiate basketball season

- Preseason AP No. 1: Michigan Wolverines
- NCAA Tournament: 1965
- Tournament dates: March 8 – 20, 1965
- National Championship: Memorial Coliseum; Portland, Oregon
- NCAA Champions: UCLA Bruins
- Helms National Champions: UCLA Bruins
- Other champions: St. John's Redmen (NIT)
- Player of the Year (Helms): Bill Bradley, Princeton Tigers; Gail Goodrich, UCLA Bruins

The 1964–65 NCAA University Division men's basketball season began in December 1964, progressed through the regular season and conference tournaments, and concluded with the 1965 NCAA University Division basketball tournament championship game on March 20, 1965, at Memorial Coliseum in Portland, Oregon. The UCLA Bruins won their second NCAA national championship with a 91–80 victory over the Michigan Wolverines.

== Season headlines ==
- The Associated Press (AP) Poll introduced a preseason Top 20, but during the season continued to rank only the Top 10 teams, as it had done since the 1961–62 season.
- The NCAA tournament contracted from 25 to 23 teams.
- The National Invitation Tournament expanded from 12 to 14 teams.
- UCLA won its second consecutive national championship, as well as its second overall.
- Bill Bradley of Princeton became the first player to score 50 or more points in an NCAA tournament Final Four game, scoring 58 against Wichita State in the national third-place game on March 20, 1965.

== Season outlook ==
=== Pre-season polls ===
The Top 20 from the AP Poll and the UPI Coaches Poll during the pre-season.

Associated Press
Ranking	Team
1	Michigan
2	UCLA
3	Wichita State
4	Davidson
5	Duke
6	Vanderbilt
7	Syracuse
8	Kansas State
9	San Francisco
10	St. John's
11 (tie)	Kentucky
11 (tie)	Minnesota
13	North Carolina
14	Bradley
15	Seattle
16	Villanova
17	Notre Dame
18	Kansas
19	BYU
20	DePaul

UPI Coaches
Ranking	Team
1	Michigan
2	UCLA
3	Davidson
4	Wichita State
5	Duke
6	Vanderbilt
7	San Francisco
8	North Carolina
9	Seattle
10	Minnesota
11	Kansas
12	Syracuse
13	Villanova
14	Kansas State
15 (tie)	Kentucky
15 (tie)	St. John's
17	BYU
18	Saint Louis
19	Notre Dame
20	DePaul

== Conference membership changes ==
School	Former conference	New conference
East Carolina Pirates	NCAA College Division independent	Southern Conference
Fairfield Stags	NCAA College Division independent	NCAA University Division independent
Georgia Tech Yellow Jackets	Southeastern Conference	NCAA University Division independent
Louisville Cardinals	NCAA University Division independent	Missouri Valley Conference
Oregon Ducks	NCAA University Division independent	Athletic Association of Western Universities
Oregon State Beavers	NCAA University Division independent	Athletic Association of Western Universities
Regis Rangers	NCAA University Division independent	NCAA College Division independent

== Regular season ==
=== Conferences ===
==== Conference winners and tournaments ====
Conference	Regular season winner	Conference player of the year	Conference tournament	Tournament venue (City)	Tournament winner
Athletic Association of Western Universities	UCLA	None selected	No Tournament		
Atlantic Coast Conference	Duke	Billy Cunningham, North Carolina	1965 ACC men's basketball tournament	Reynolds Coliseum (Raleigh, North Carolina)	NC State
Big Eight Conference	Oklahoma State	None selected	No Tournament		
Big Sky Conference	Weber State	None selected	No Tournament		
Big Ten Conference	Michigan	None selected	No Tournament		
Ivy League	Princeton	None selected	No Tournament		
Mid-American Conference	Ohio	None selected	No Tournament		
Middle Atlantic Conference	Saint Joseph's		No Tournament		
Missouri Valley Conference	Wichita State	None selected	No Tournament		
Ohio Valley Conference	Eastern Kentucky State	Clem Haskins, Western Kentucky State	1965 Ohio Valley Conference men's basketball tournament	Jefferson County Armory (Louisville, Kentucky)	Western Kentucky State
Southeastern Conference	Vanderbilt	Clyde Lee, Vanderbilt	No Tournament		
Southern Conference	Davidson	Fred Hetzel, Davidson	1965 Southern Conference men's basketball tournament	Charlotte Coliseum (Charlotte, North Carolina)	West Virginia
Southwest Conference	SMU & Texas	John Beasley, Texas A&M	No Tournament		
West Coast Athletic Conference	San Francisco	Ollie Johnson, San Francisco	No Tournament		
Western Athletic Conference	BYU	None selected	No Tournament		
Yankee Conference	Connecticut	None selected	No Tournament		

==== Conference standings ====
1964–65 AAWU Conference men's basketball standings
	Conf.				Overall
Team	W		L	PCT	W		L	PCT
No. 2 UCLA	14	–	0	1.000	28	–	2	.933
Stanford	9	–	5	.643	15	–	8	.652
USC	8	–	6	.571	14	–	12	.538
Oregon State	7	–	7	.500	16	–	10	.615
Washington State	6	–	8	.429	9	–	17	.346
Washington	5	–	9	.357	9	–	16	.360
California	4	–	10	.286	8	–	15	.348
Oregon	3	–	11	.214	9	–	17	.346
As of November 25, 2011; Rankings from AP Poll

1964–65 ACC men's basketball standings
	Conf.				Overall
Team	W		L	PCT	W		L	PCT
No. 10 Duke	11	–	3	.786	20	–	5	.800
NC State †	10	–	4	.714	21	–	5	.808
Maryland	10	–	4	.714	18	–	8	.692
North Carolina	10	–	4	.714	15	–	9	.625
Wake Forest	6	–	8	.429	12	–	15	.444
Clemson	4	–	10	.286	8	–	15	.348
Virginia	3	–	11	.214	7	–	18	.280
South Carolina	2	–	12	.143	6	–	17	.261
† 1965 ACC tournament winner Rankings from AP Poll

1964–65 Big Eight Conference men's basketball standings
	Conf.				Overall
Team	W		L	PCT	W		L	PCT
Oklahoma State	12	–	2	.857	20	–	7	.741
Kansas	9	–	5	.643	17	–	8	.680
Missouri	8	–	6	.571	13	–	11	.542
Colorado	8	–	6	.571	13	–	12	.520
Iowa State	6	–	8	.429	9	–	16	.360
Kansas State	5	–	9	.357	12	–	13	.480
Nebraska	5	–	9	.357	10	–	15	.400
Oklahoma	3	–	11	.214	8	–	17	.320
Rankings from AP Poll

1964–65 Big Sky men's basketball standings
	Conf.				Overall
Team	W		L	PCT	W		L	PCT
Weber State	8	–	2	.800	22	–	3	.880
Gonzaga	6	–	4	.600	18	–	8	.692
Montana State	6	–	4	.600	15	–	10	.600
Idaho	4	–	6	.400	6	–	19	.240
Idaho State	4	–	6	.400	7	–	19	.269
Montana	2	–	8	.200	11	–	15	.423

1964–65 Big Ten Conference men's basketball standings
	Conf.				Overall
Team	W		L	PCT	W		L	PCT
No. 1 Michigan	13	–	1	.929	24	–	4	.857
No. 7 Minnesota	11	–	3	.786	19	–	5	.792
Illinois	10	–	4	.714	18	–	6	.750
Indiana	9	–	5	.643	19	–	5	.792
Iowa	8	–	6	.571	14	–	10	.583
Ohio State	6	–	8	.429	12	–	12	.500
Purdue	5	–	9	.357	12	–	12	.500
Wisconsin	4	–	10	.286	9	–	13	.409
Northwestern	3	–	11	.214	7	–	17	.292
Michigan State	1	–	13	.071	5	–	18	.217
Rankings from AP Poll

1964–65 Ivy League men's basketball standings
	Conf.				Overall
Team	W		L	PCT	W		L	PCT
Princeton	13	–	1	.929	23	–	6	.793
Cornell	11	–	3	.786	19	–	5	.792
Penn	10	–	4	.714	15	–	10	.600
Yale	7	–	7	.500	10	–	12	.455
Harvard	6	–	8	.429	11	–	12	.478
Columbia	5	–	9	.357	7	–	15	.318
Brown	3	–	11	.214	7	–	17	.292
Dartmouth	1	–	13	.071	4	–	21	.160
Rankings from AP Poll

1964–65 Mid-American Conference men's basketball standings
	Conf.				Overall
Team	W		L	PCT	W		L	PCT
Ohio	11	–	1	.917	19	–	7	.731
Miami (Ohio)	11	–	1	.917	20	–	5	.800
Toledo	6	–	6	.500	13	–	11	.542
Bowling Green State	6	–	6	.500	9	–	15	.375
Kent State	4	–	8	.333	9	–	11	.450
Western Michigan	3	–	9	.250	8	–	16	.333
Marshall	1	–	11	.083	4	–	20	.167
Rankings from AP Poll

1964–65 MAC men's basketball standings
	Conf.				Overall
Team	W		L	PCT	W		L	PCT
No. 3 Saint Joseph's†	5	–	0	1.000	26	–	3	.897
La Salle	5	–	1	.833	15	–	8	.652
Lafayette	8	–	3	.727	12	–	8	.600
Temple	4	–	3	.571	14	–	10	.583
Bucknell	4	–	5	.444	11	–	13	.458
Gettysburg	4	–	6	.400	12	–	11	.522
Lehigh	4	–	6	.400	7	–	13	.350
Delaware	0	–	10	.000	3	–	17	.150
† Regular-season championship winner Rankings from AP Poll

1964–65 Missouri Valley Conference men's basketball standings
	Conf.				Overall
Team	W		L	PCT	W		L	PCT
Wichita State	11	–	3	.786	21	–	9	.700
Bradley	9	–	5	.643	18	–	9	.667
Saint Louis	9	–	5	.643	18	–	9	.667
Louisville	8	–	6	.571	15	–	10	.600
Tulsa	7	–	7	.500	14	–	11	.560
Drake	6	–	8	.429	15	–	10	.600
Cincinnati	5	–	9	.357	14	–	12	.538
North Texas State	1	–	13	.071	7	–	19	.269
Rankings from AP Poll

1964–65 Ohio Valley Conference men's basketball standings
	Conf.				Overall
Team	W		L	PCT	W		L	PCT
Eastern Kentucky State	13	–	1	.929	19	–	6	.760
Western Kentucky State	10	–	4	.714	18	–	9	.667
Murray State	9	–	5	.643	19	–	7	.731
Tennessee Tech	8	–	6	.571	14	–	11	.560
Morehead State	6	–	8	.429	13	–	10	.565
East Tennessee State	4	–	10	.286	6	–	17	.261
Middle Tennessee	4	–	10	.286	6	–	18	.250
Austin Peay State	2	–	12	.143	4	–	17	.190
Rankings from AP Poll

1964–65 Southeastern Conference men's basketball standings
	Conf.				Overall
Team	W		L	PCT	W		L	PCT
No. 5 Vanderbilt	15	–	1	.938	24	–	4	.857
Tennessee	12	–	4	.750	20	–	5	.800
Florida	11	–	5	.688	18	–	7	.720
Auburn	11	–	5	.688	16	–	9	.640
Kentucky	10	–	6	.625	15	–	10	.600
Alabama	9	–	7	.563	17	–	9	.654
LSU	7	–	9	.438	12	–	14	.462
Mississippi State	6	–	10	.375	10	–	16	.385
Georgia	4	–	12	.250	8	–	18	.308
Tulane	2	–	14	.125	3	–	22	.120
Ole Miss	1	–	15	.063	4	–	21	.160
Rankings from AP Poll

1964–65 Southern Conference men's basketball standings
	Conf.				Overall
Team	W		L	PCT	W		L	PCT
No. 6 Davidson	12	–	0	1.000	24	–	2	.923
Virginia Tech	9	–	5	.643	13	–	10	.565
The Citadel	8	–	4	.667	13	–	11	.542
West Virginia †	8	–	6	.571	14	–	15	.483
George Washington	6	–	7	.462	10	–	13	.435
William & Mary	6	–	8	.429	12	–	13	.480
Richmond	6	–	10	.375	10	–	16	.385
VMI	5	–	9	.357	8	–	13	.381
Furman	2	–	13	.133	6	–	19	.240
East Carolina*		–		–	12	–	10	.545
† Tournament winner * – Played as non-major program As of April 30, 1965; Rankings from AP Poll

1964–65 Southwest Conference men's basketball standings
	Conf.				Overall
Team	W		L	PCT	W		L	PCT
Texas†	10	–	4	.714	16	–	9	.640
SMU†	10	–	4	.714	17	–	10	.630
Baylor	8	–	6	.571	15	–	9	.625
Texas A&M	7	–	7	.500	14	–	10	.583
Arkansas	5	–	9	.357	9	–	14	.391
TCU	3	–	11	.214	6	–	18	.250
Rice	1	–	13	.071	2	–	22	.083
Texas Tech	12	–	2	.857	17	–	6	.739
† Regular-season co-championship winner Rankings from AP Poll

1964–65 West Coast Athletic Conference men's basketball standings
	Conf.				Overall
Team	W		L	PCT	W		L	PCT
San Francisco	13	–	1	.929	24	–	5	.828
Santa Clara	9	–	5	.643	14	–	12	.538
San Jose State		–		–	14	–	10	.583
Pacific	8	–	6	.571	13	–	12	.520
UC Santa Barbara	7	–	7	.500	12	–	14	.462
Saint Mary's	5	–	9	.357	8	–	18	.308
Pepperdine	3	–	11	.214	6	–	19	.240
Loyola (Calif.)	2	–	12	.143	6	–	20	.231
Rankings from AP Poll

1964–65 WAC men's basketball standings
	Conf.				Overall
Team	W		L	PCT	W		L	PCT
No. 9 BYU	8	–	2	.800	21	–	7	.750
New Mexico	5	–	5	.500	19	–	8	.704
Arizona	5	–	5	.500	17	–	9	.654
Wyoming	5	–	5	.500	16	–	10	.615
Arizona State	4	–	6	.400	13	–	14	.481
Utah	3	–	7	.300	17	–	9	.654
Rankings from AP Poll

1964–65 Yankee Conference men's basketball standings
	Conf.				Overall
Team	W		L	PCT	W		L	PCT
Connecticut	10	–	0	1.000	23	–	3	.885
Massachusetts	8	–	2	.800	13	–	11	.542
Rhode Island	6	–	4	.600	15	–	11	.577
Maine	4	–	6	.400	13	–	10	.565
Vermont	1	–	9	.100	7	–	13	.350
New Hampshire	1	–	9	.100	2	–	19	.095

=== University Division independents ===
A total of 53 college teams played as University Division independents. Among them, Providence (24–2) had both the best winning percentage (.923) and the most wins.

1964–65 NCAA University Division men's basketball independents standings
	Conf.				Overall
Team	W		L	PCT	W		L	PCT
No. 4 Providence		–		–	24	–	2	.923
Miami		–		–	22	–	4	.846
Penn State		–		–	20	–	4	.833
No. 8 Villanova		–		–	23	–	5	.821
Dayton		–		–	22	–	7	.759
Boston College		–		–	21	–	7	.750
Seattle		–		–	19	–	7	.731
Army		–		–	21	–	8	.724
St. John's		–		–	21	–	8	.724
Detroit		–		–	20	–	8	.714
Hardin–Simmons		–		–	17	–	8	.680
Oklahoma City		–		–	21	–	10	.677
Colorado State		–		–	16	–	8	.667
Fairfield		–		–	14	–	7	.667
Houston		–		–	19	–	10	.655
St. Bonaventure		–		–	15	–	8	.652
Texas Western		–		–	16	–	9	.640
West Texas State		–		–	16	–	9	.640
DePaul		–		–	17	–	10	.630
Florida State		–		–	16	–	10	.615
NYU		–		–	16	–	10	.615
Manhattan		–		–	13	–	9	.591
Duquesne		–		–	14	–	10	.583
Creighton		–		–	13	–	10	.565
Georgetown		–		–	13	–	10	.565
Holy Cross		–		–	13	–	10	.565
Syracuse		–		–	13	–	10	.565
Georgia Tech		–		–	14	–	11	.560
Fordham		–		–	15	–	12	.556
Notre Dame		–		–	15	–	12	.556
St. Francis (NY)		–		–	11	–	9	.550
Centenary		–		–	13	–	11	.542
Iona		–		–	12	–	11	.522
Utah State		–		–	13	–	12	.520
Rutgers		–		–	12	–	12	.500
Boston University		–		–	10	–	10	.500
Navy		–		–	10	–	10	.500
Portland		–		–	12	–	13	.480
Seton Hall		–		–	12	–	13	.480
Canisius		–		–	10	–	12	.455
Denver		–		–	11	–	14	.440
Loyola Chicago		–		–	11	–	14	.440
Butler		–		–	11	–	15	.423
Memphis State		–		–	10	–	14	.417
Saint Francis (PA)		–		–	10	–	15	.400
Xavier		–		–	10	–	15	.400
Air Force		–		–	9	–	14	.391
Loyola (LA)		–		–	8	–	16	.333
Marquette		–		–	8	–	18	.308
New Mexico State		–		–	8	–	18	.308
Colgate		–		–	7	–	16	.304
Pittsburgh		–		–	7	–	16	.304
Niagara		–		–	4	–	17	.190
Rankings from AP Poll

=== Informal championships ===
Conference	Regular season winner	Most Valuable Player
Philadelphia Big 5	Saint Joseph's	Jim Washington, Villanova

Saint Joseph's finished with a 4–0 record in head-to-head competition among the Philadelphia Big 5.

== Post-season tournaments ==
=== NCAA tournament ===
==== Final Four ====
National semifinals
E	Princeton	76
ME	Michigan	93
MW	Wichita State	89
W	UCLA	108

National finals
ME	Michigan	80
W	UCLA	91
Third place
E	Princeton	118
MW	Wichita State	82

=== National Invitation tournament ===
==== Semifinals & finals ====
Semifinals
Villanova	91
NYU	69
St. John's	67
Army	60

Finals
Villanova	51
St. John's	55
Third place
NYU	74
Army	75

== Awards ==
=== Consensus All-American teams ===
Consensus First Team
Player	Position	Class	Team
Rick Barry	F	Senior	Miami (FL)
Bill Bradley	F	Senior	Princeton
Gail Goodrich	G	Senior	UCLA
Fred Hetzel	F	Senior	Davidson
Cazzie Russell	F	Junior	Michigan

Consensus Second Team
Player	Position	Class	Team
Bill Buntin	F	Senior	Michigan
Wayne Estes	F	Senior	Utah State
Clyde Lee	F	Junior	Vanderbilt
Dave Schellhase	G/F	Junior	Purdue
Dave Stallworth	F	Senior	Wichita State

=== Major player of the year awards ===
- Helms Player of the Year: Bill Bradley, Princeton, & Gail Goodrich, UCLA
- Associated Press Player of the Year: Bill Bradley, Princeton
- UPI Player of the Year: Bill Bradley, Princeton
- Oscar Robertson Trophy (USBWA): Bill Bradley, Princeton
- Sporting News Player of the Year: Bill Bradley, Princeton

=== Major coach of the year awards ===
- Henry Iba Award: Butch van Breda Kolff, Princeton
- NABC Coach of the Year: Butch van Breda Kolff, Princeton
- UPI Coach of the Year: Dave Strack, Michigan

=== Other major awards ===
- Robert V. Geasey Trophy (Top player in Philadelphia Big 5): Jim Washington, Villanova
- NIT/Haggerty Award (Top player in New York City metro area): Warren Isaac, Iona

== Coaching changes ==
A number of teams changed coaches during the season and after it ended.

Team	Former Coach	Interim Coach	New Coach	Reason
Army	Tates Locke		Bob Knight	Locke left to become freshman coach at Miami (Ohio) and was replaced by his 24-year-old assistant, future Hall of Fame coach Knight.
Bradley	Chuck Orsborn		Joe Stowell	Orsborn was promoted to Bradley Athletic Director and passed on head coaching duties to assistant Stowell.
Cincinnati	Ed Jucker		Tay Baker	
Georgia	Harbin Lawson		Ken Rosemond	
Holy Cross	Frank Oftring		Jack Donohue	Oftring retired from coaching and was replaced with Donohue, who had been prized recruit Lew Alcindor's coach at Power Memorial Academy.
Idaho State	James Nau		Claude Retherford	
Indiana	Branch McCracken		Lou Watson	
La Salle	Bob Walters		Joe Heyer	
LSU	Jay McCreary		Frank Truitt	
Michigan State	Forddy Anderson		John Bennington	
Middle Tennessee	Bill Stokes		Ken Trickey	
Mississippi State	Babe McCarthy		Joe Dan Gold	
New Mexico State	Presley Askew		Jim McGregor	
Niagara	John J. Gallagher		James Maloney	
North Texas State	Charles Johnson		Dan Spika	
Purdue	Ray Eddy		George King	
Saint Louis	John Bennington		Buddy Brehmer	Bennington left to coach Michigan State.
San Jose State	Stu Inman		Dan Glines	
Seattle	Bob Boyd		Lionell Purcell	
St. John's	Joe Lapchick		Lou Carnesecca	
Toledo	Ed Melvin		Bob Nichols	
Vermont	John C. Evans		Arthur Loche	
Wake Forest	Bones McKinney		Jack Murdock	
West Virginia	George King		Bucky Waters	King left to coach Purdue.
