= NCAA Division I men's basketball tournament records =

== Champions, runners-up, and locations ==
| Year | Champion | | Runner-up | | Venue and city | |
|---|---|---|---|---|---|---|
| 2000 | Michigan State (2) | 89 | Florida | 76 | RCA Dome | Indianapolis, Indiana (4) |
| 2001 | Duke (3) | 82 | Arizona | 72 | Hubert H. Humphrey Metrodome | Minneapolis, Minnesota (3) |
| 2002 | Maryland | 64 | Indiana | 52 | Georgia Dome | Atlanta, Georgia (2) |
| 2003 | Syracuse | 81 | Kansas | 78 | Louisiana Superdome | New Orleans, Louisiana (4) |
| 2004 | UConn (2) | 82 | Georgia Tech | 73 | Alamodome | San Antonio, Texas (2) |
| 2005 | North Carolina (4) | 75 | Illinois | 70 | Edward Jones Dome | St. Louis, Missouri (3) |
| 2006 | Florida | 73 | UCLA | 57 | RCA Dome | Indianapolis, Indiana (5) |
| 2007 | Florida (2) | 84 | Ohio State | 75 | Georgia Dome | Atlanta, Georgia (3) |
| 2008† | Kansas (3) | 75 | Memphis* | 68 | Alamodome | San Antonio, Texas (3) |
| 2009 | North Carolina (5) | 89 | Michigan State | 72 | Ford Field | Detroit, Michigan |
| 2010 | Duke (4) | 61 | Butler | 59 | Lucas Oil Stadium | Indianapolis, Indiana (6) |
| 2011 | UConn (3) | 53 | Butler | 41 | Reliant Stadium | Houston, Texas (2) |
| 2012 | Kentucky (8) | 67 | Kansas | 59 | Mercedes-Benz Superdome | New Orleans, Louisiana (5) |
| 2013 | Louisville* (3) | 82 | Michigan | 76 | Georgia Dome | Atlanta, Georgia (4) |
| 2014 | UConn (4) | 60 | Kentucky | 54 | AT&T Stadium | Arlington, Texas |
| 2015 | Duke (5) | 68 | Wisconsin | 63 | Lucas Oil Stadium | Indianapolis, Indiana (7) |
| 2016 | Villanova (2) | 77 | North Carolina | 74 | NRG Stadium | Houston, Texas (3) |
| 2017 | North Carolina (6) | 71 | Gonzaga | 65 | University of Phoenix Stadium | Glendale, Arizona |
| 2018 | Villanova (3) | 79 | Michigan | 62 | Alamodome | San Antonio, Texas (4) |
| 2019† | Virginia | 85 | Texas Tech | 77 | U.S. Bank Stadium | Minneapolis, Minnesota (4) |
| 2021 | Baylor | 86 | Gonzaga | 70 | Lucas Oil Stadium | Indianapolis, Indiana (8) |
| 2022 | Kansas (4) | 72 | North Carolina | 69 | Caesars Superdome | New Orleans, Louisiana (6) |
| 2023 | UConn (5) | 76 | San Diego State | 59 | NRG Stadium | Houston, Texas (4) |
| 2024 | UConn (6) | 75 | Purdue | 60 | University of Phoenix Stadium | Glendale, Arizona (2) |
| 2025 | Florida (3) | 65 | Houston | 63 | Alamodome | San Antonio, Texas (5) |
| 2026 | Michigan (2) | 69 | UConn | 63 | Lucas Oil Stadium | Indianapolis, Indiana (5) |

* Vacated by NCAA.
† Overtime game. Multiple †'s indicate number of overtimes.

== All-time coaching records ==
Active coaches in bold

=== Tournament Game Wins ===
| Coach | School | Wins |
|---|---|---|
| Mike Krzyzewski | Duke | 101 |
| Roy Williams | Kansas, North Carolina | 77 |
| Dean Smith | North Carolina | 65 |
| Jim Boeheim | Syracuse | 61 |
| **Tom Izzo** | Michigan State | 61 |
| **John Calipari** | UMass, Memphis, Kentucky, Arkansas | 61 |
| **Bill Self** | Oral Roberts, Tulsa, Illinois, Kansas | 58 |
| Rick Pitino | Boston University, Providence, Kentucky, Louisville, Iona, St. John's | 55 |
| Jim Calhoun | UConn | 49 |
| John Wooden | UCLA | 47 |
| Lute Olson | Iowa, Arizona | 46 |
| Bob Knight | Indiana, Texas Tech | 45 |

=== Final Four appearances by coach ===
| Coach | School | Appearances |
|---|---|---|
| Mike Krzyzewski | Duke | 13 |
| John Wooden | UCLA | 12 |
| Dean Smith | North Carolina | 11 |
| Roy Williams | Kansas, North Carolina | 9 |
| **Tom Izzo** | Michigan State | 8 |
| **Rick Pitino** | Providence, Kentucky, Louisville* | 7* |
| Denny Crum | Louisville | 6 |
| Adolph Rupp | Kentucky | 6 |
| **John Calipari** | UMass*, Memphis*, Kentucky | 6* |
| Bob Knight | Indiana | 5 |
| Guy Lewis | Houston | 5 |
| Lute Olson | Iowa, Arizona | 5 |
| Jim Boeheim | Syracuse | 5 |
| Billy Donovan | Florida | 4 |
| **Bill Self** | Kansas | 4 |
| Jim Calhoun | UConn | 4 |
| Jay Wright | Villanova | 4 |

* Vacated by NCAA.

=== Multiple championship coaches ===
| Coach | School | Championships |
|---|---|---|
| John Wooden | UCLA | 10 |
| Mike Krzyzewski | Duke | 5 |
| Adolph Rupp | Kentucky | 4 |
| Roy Williams | North Carolina | 3 |
| Jim Calhoun | UConn | 3 |
| Bob Knight | Indiana | 3 |
| Denny Crum | Louisville | 2 |
| Billy Donovan | Florida | 2 |
| Henry Iba | Oklahoma State | 2 |
| Ed Jucker | Cincinnati | 2 |
| Branch McCracken | Indiana | 2 |
| Dean Smith | North Carolina | 2 |
| Phil Woolpert | San Francisco | 2 |
| Jay Wright | Villanova | 2 |
| **Rick Pitino** | Kentucky, Louisville* | 2* |
| **Dan Hurley** | UConn | 2 |
| **Bill Self** | Kansas | 2 |

* Vacated by NCAA.

== All-time team records ==
=== NCAA Championships ===
| Rank | School | # and Coach(es) |
|---|---|---|
| 1 | UCLA | 11 – John Wooden (10), Jim Harrick (1) |
| 2 | Kentucky | 8 – Adolph Rupp (4), Joe B. Hall (1), Rick Pitino (1), Tubby Smith (1), John Calipari (1) |
| 3 | North Carolina | 6 – Frank McGuire (1), Dean Smith (2), Roy Williams (3) |
| 3 | UConn | 6 – Jim Calhoun (3), Kevin Ollie (1), Dan Hurley (2) |
| 5 | Duke | 5 – Mike Krzyzewski |
| 5 | Indiana | 5 – Branch McCracken (2), Bob Knight (3) |
| 7 | Kansas | 4 – Phog Allen (1), Larry Brown (1), Bill Self (2) |
| 8 | Villanova | 3 – Jay Wright (2), Rollie Massimino (1) |
| 8 | Florida | 3 – Billy Donovan (2), Todd Golden (1) |
| 10 | Louisville | 2* – Denny Crum (2) |
| 10 | Cincinnati | 2 – Ed Jucker |
| 10 | Oklahoma State | 2 – Henry Iba |
| 10 | San Francisco | 2 – Phil Woolpert |
| 10 | Michigan | 2 - Steve Fisher (1), Dusty May (1) |
| 10 | Michigan State | 2 – Jud Heathcote (1), Tom Izzo (1) |
| 10 | NC State | 2 – Norm Sloan (1), Jim Valvano (1) |

* Championships vacated by NCAA not included

=== NCAA Championship Game appearances ===
| Rank | School | Appearances | Wins | Losses |
|---|---|---|---|---|
| T-1 | UCLA* | 12 | 11 | 1 |
| T-1 | Kentucky | 12 | 8 | 4 |
| T-1 | North Carolina | 12 | 6 | 6 |
| 4 | Duke | 11 | 5 | 6 |
| 5 | Kansas | 10 | 4 | 6 |
| 6 | UConn | 7 | 6 | 1 |
| T-7 | Indiana | 6 | 5 | 1 |
| T-7 | Michigan* | 6 | 2 | 4 |
| 9 | Ohio State | 5 | 1 | 4 |
| 10 | Florida | 4 | 3 | 1 |
| 10 | Georgetown | 4 | 1 | 3 |

* Appearances vacated by NCAA not included

=== NCAA Tournament Final Four appearances ===
| Rank | School | # |
|---|---|---|
| 1 | North Carolina | 21 |
| 2 | Duke | 18 |
| 2 | UCLA | 18* |
| 4 | Kentucky | 17 |
| 5 | Kansas | 15* |
| 6 | Ohio State | 10* |
| 6 | Michigan State | 10 |
| 8 | Indiana | 8 |
| 8 | Louisville | 8* |
| 8 | UConn | 8 |

* Appearances vacated by NCAA not included

=== Consecutive NCAA Tournament Final Four appearances ===
| Rank | School | Number of Years |
|---|---|---|
| 1 | UCLA | 10 (1967–1976) |
| 2 | Cincinnati | 5 (1959–1963) |
| 2 | Duke | 5 (1988–1992) |
| 4 | Houston | 3 (1982–1984) |
| 4 | Kentucky | 3 (1996–1998) |
| 4 | Michigan State | 3 (1999–2001) |
| 4 | North Carolina | 3 (1967–1969) |
| 4 | Ohio State | 3 (1944–1946) |
| 4 | Ohio State | 3 (1960–1962) |
| 4 | San Francisco | 3 (1955–1957) |
| 4 | UCLA | 3 (2006–2008) |

=== NCAA Tournament appearances ===
| Rank | School | # |
|---|---|---|
| 1 | Kentucky | 63* |
| 2 | North Carolina | 55 |
| 3 | Kansas | 53 |
| 4 | UCLA | 52^ |
| 5 | Duke | 48 |
| 6 | Indiana | 41 |
| 6 | Syracuse | 41† |
| 6 | Louisville | 41†† |
| 6 | Villanova | 41††† |
| 10 | Texas | 40 |

* NCAA vacated 2–1 tournament record (1988)
^ NCAA vacated 5–2 tournament record (1980, 1999)
† NCAA vacated 4–4 tournament record (2005–06, 2011–12), but confirmed Syracuse can claim tournament appearances.
†† NCAA vacated 15–3 tournament record (2012–15)
††† NCAA vacated 4–1 tournament record (1971)

=== Consecutive NCAA Tournament appearances ===
Teams in bold denote an active streak as of the 2023 tournament

| Rank | School | Number of Years |
|---|---|---|
| **1** | **Kansas** | **36 (1990–present)#** |
| **2** | **Michigan State** | **28 (1998–present)** |
| 3 | North Carolina | 27 (1975–2001) |
| **3** | **Gonzaga** | **27 (1999–present)** |
| 5 | Arizona | 25 (1985–2009)* |
| 6 | Duke | 24 (1996–2019) |
| 7 | Wisconsin | 19 (1999–2017) |
| 8 | Indiana | 18 (1986–2003) |
| 9 | Kentucky | 17 (1992–2008) |
| 10 | UCLA | 15 (1967–1981)^ |

* NCAA vacated 1999 and 2008 appearances
^ NCAA vacated 1980 appearance
# NCAA vacated 2018 appearance

=== NCAA Tournament victories ===
| Rank | School | # |
|---|---|---|
| 1 | North Carolina | 134 |
| 2 | Kentucky | 133* |
| 3 | Duke | 129 |
| 4 | Kansas | 114* |
| 5 | UCLA | 112* |
| 6 | Michigan State | 78 |
| 7 | UConn | 75 |
| 8 | Indiana | 68 |
| 9 | Michigan | 67* |
| 9 | Villanova | 67* |

* Denotes vacated records not included

- Margin of 10 points: Oregon (1939), Kentucky (1949), San Francisco (1956), Ohio State (1960), UCLA (1967, 1970, 1973), Michigan State (1979, 2000), Indiana (1981), Duke (2001), North Carolina (2009), Villanova (2018), and UConn (2023, 2024) are teams to win every game in the tournament by 10 points or more on their way to a championship.

== Individual single-game records ==
- Points

61, Austin Carr, Notre Dame vs. Ohio, 1970

- Field goals

25, Austin Carr, Notre Dame vs. Ohio, 1970

- Field goal attempts

44, Austin Carr, Notre Dame vs. Ohio, 1970

- Three-point field goals

11, Jeff Fryer, Loyola Marymount vs. Michigan, 1990

- Three-point field goal attempts

22, Jeff Fryer, Loyola Marymount vs. Arkansas, 1989

- Free throws made

23, Bob Carney, Bradley vs. Colorado, 1954
23, Travis Mays, Texas vs. Georgia, 1990

- Free throws attempted

27, Travis Mays, Texas vs. Georgia, 1990
27, David Robinson, Navy vs. Syracuse, 1986

- Rebounds

34, Fred Cohen, Temple vs. Connecticut, 1956

- Assists

19, Markquis Nowell, Kansas State vs. Michigan State, 2023

- Blocked shots

11, Shaquille O'Neal, LSU vs. BYU, 1992

- Steals

8, Ty Lawson, North Carolina vs. Michigan State, 2009
8, Russ Smith, Louisville vs. North Carolina A&T, 2013
8, JD Notae, Arkansas vs. New Mexico State, 2022

- Triple-doubles (see Final Four records section for other tournament triple-doubles)
  - The NCAA officially recorded assists for two seasons in the early 1950s, but discontinued the practice after the 1951–52 season, not resuming until the 1984–85 season. Steals and blocks were not officially added as NCAA statistics until the 1986–87 season. As a result, the NCAA only officially recognizes tournament triple-doubles recorded from 1987 onward.

Gary Grant, Michigan — 24 points, 10 rebounds, 10 assists vs. North Carolina, East Regional second round, March 14, 1987
Shaquille O'Neal, LSU — 26 points, 13 rebounds, 11 blocks vs. BYU, West Regional first round, March 19, 1992
David Cain, St. John's — 12 points, 11 rebounds, 11 assists vs. Texas Tech, East Regional first round, March 18, 1993
Andre Miller, Utah — 18 points, 14 rebounds, 13 assists vs. Arizona, West Regional Final, March 21, 1998
Dwyane Wade, Marquette — 29 points, 11 rebounds, 11 assists vs. Kentucky, Midwest Regional Final, March 29, 2003
Cole Aldrich, Kansas — 13 points, 20 rebounds, 10 blocks vs. Dayton, Midwest Regional Second Round, March 22, 2009
Draymond Green, Michigan State — 23 points, 11 rebounds, 10 assists vs. UCLA, Southeast Regional Second Round, March 18, 2011
Draymond Green, Michigan State — 24 points, 12 rebounds, 10 assists vs. LIU Brooklyn, West Regional Second Round, March 16, 2012
Ja Morant, Murray State — 17 points, 11 rebounds, 16 assists vs. Marquette, West Regional First Round, March 21, 2019
Marcus Domask, Illinois — 12 points, 11 rebounds, 10 assists vs. Morehead State, East Regional First Round, March 21, 2024

== Team single-game records ==
=== All tournament games ===
- Most total points scored, one tournament

571, UNLV, 1990

- Most combined points

264, Loyola Marymount vs. Michigan, 1990

- Most points by a single team

149, Loyola Marymount vs. Michigan, 1990

- Fewest points for a single team

20, North Carolina vs. Pittsburgh, 1941

- Most Field Goals Made

52, Iowa vs. Notre Dame, 1970

- Field Goals Attempted

71, Marshall vs. Southwestern Louisiana, 1972

- Three-point Field Goals

26, Kansas vs. Villanova, 2022

- Three-point Field Goal Attempts

59, Purdue vs. Virginia, 2019

- Free Throws Made

43, Arizona vs. Illinois, 2001

- Free Throws Attempted

56, Arizona vs. Illinois, 2001

- Rebounds

86, Notre Dame vs. Tennessee Tech, 1958

- Assists

36, North Carolina vs. Loyola Marymount, 1988

- Blocked Shots

15, Kentucky vs. Stony Brook, 2016

- Steals

20, Louisville vs. North Carolina A&T, 2013

- Combined Steals

35, UCLA vs. Kansas, 2007

=== National Championship game ===
- Most combined points

182, Kentucky vs. Duke, 1978

- Most points by a single team

103, UNLV vs. Duke, 1990

- Largest margin at halftime

21, North Carolina vs. Michigan State, 2009

- Largest score at halftime

55, North Carolina vs. Michigan State, 2009

- Largest margin of victory

30, UNLV vs. Duke, 1990

== Final Four records ==
Final Four Single Game – Individual

- Points

58, Bill Bradley, Princeton vs. Wichita State, N3rd, 3-20-1965

- Field goals made

22, Bill Bradley, Princeton vs. Wichita State, N3rd, 3-20-1965

- Field goals attempted

42, Lennie Rosenbluth, North Carolina vs. Michigan State, NSF, 3-22-1957

- Three-point field goals

10, Freddie Banks, UNLV vs. Indiana, NSF, 3-28-1987

- Rebounds

27, Bill Russell, San Francisco vs. Iowa, CH, 3-23-1956

- Assists

18, Mark Wade, UNLV vs. Indiana, NSF, 3-28-1987

- Blocks

7, Jeff Withey, Kansas vs. Ohio State, NSF, 3-31-2012

- Free throws attempted

18, Ty Lawson, North Carolina vs. Michigan State, CH, 4-6-2009

- Steals

8, Ty Lawson, North Carolina vs. Michigan State, CH, 4-6-2009

- Final Four triple-doubles
  - The NCAA recognizes these achievements as unofficial triple-doubles. As noted earlier, assists, steals, and blocks were not kept on a national basis until well into the 1980s; the current array of national statistics did not fully take shape until the 1986–87 season.

B.H. Born, Kansas vs. Indiana, CH, 3-18-1953: 26 pts., 15 rebs. & 13 blocked shots.
Oscar Robertson, Cincinnati vs. Louisville, N3rd, 3-21-1959: 39 pts., 17 rebs. & 10 asts.
Magic Johnson, Michigan State vs. Penn, NSF, 3-24-1979: 29 pts., 10 rebs. & 10 asts.

- Largest margin of victory: 44, Villanova vs. Oklahoma, 4-2-2016

Key to initials: NSF- National Semi-Final; N3rd – National Third-Place Game (Discontinued after 1981); CH – Championship Game.
