= 1964–65 North Carolina Tar Heels men's basketball team =

American college basketball season

1964–65 North Carolina Tar Heels men's basketball
- Conference: Atlantic Coast Conference
- Record: 15–9 (10–4 ACC)
- Head coach: Dean Smith (4th season)
- Assistant coach: Ken Rosemond
- Captain: Billy Cunningham
- Home arena: Woollen Gymnasium

1964–65 ACC men's basketball standings
	Conf.				Overall
Team	W		L	PCT	W		L	PCT
No. 10 Duke	11	–	3	.786	20	–	5	.800
NC State †	10	–	4	.714	21	–	5	.808
Maryland	10	–	4	.714	18	–	8	.692
North Carolina	10	–	4	.714	15	–	9	.625
Wake Forest	6	–	8	.429	12	–	15	.444
Clemson	4	–	10	.286	8	–	15	.348
Virginia	3	–	11	.214	7	–	18	.280
South Carolina	2	–	12	.143	6	–	17	.261
† 1965 ACC tournament winner Rankings from AP Poll

The 1964–65 North Carolina Tar Heels men's basketball team represented the University of North Carolina at Chapel Hill during the 1964–65 men's college basketball season.

== Roster ==
- Billy Cunningham
- Bobby Lewis
- Ray Respess
- Tom Gauntlett
- Ian Morrison
- John Yonkley
- Bob Bennett
- Mark Mirken
- Bill Brown
- Ray Hassell
- Pud Hassell
- Mike Smith
- Jim Smithwick

== Schedule ==
Date time, TV	Rank^{#}	Opponent^{#}	Result	Record	High points	High rebounds	High assists	Site (attendance) city, state
December 1	No. 13	Clemson	W 77–59		Woollen Gymnasium; Chapel Hill, NC			
December 3*	No. 13	at Georgia	L 61–64		–	24 – Cunningham	–	Athens, GA
December 5	No. 13	at South Carolina	W 82–71		Columbia, SC			
December 7*	No. 13	vs. No. 11 Kentucky	W 82–67		Charlotte, NC			
December 10*		Tulane	W 111–74		48 – Cunningham	25 – Cunningham	–	Woollen Gymnasium; Chapel Hill, NC
December 12*		at Indiana	L 81–107		Bloomington, IN			
December 14*		vs. No. 3 Vanderbilt	W 84–78		Greensboro, NC			
December 18*		vs. Mississippi State; Virginia Tech Tournament	W 84–80		Blacksburg, VA			
December 19*		vs. Alabama; Virginia Tech Tournament	L 61–66		Blacksburg, VA			
December 21*		at Florida	L 54–73		Gainesville, FL			
January 4		at Maryland	L 68–76		College Park, MD			
January 6		at Wake Forest	L 85–107		Winston-Salem, NC			
January 9		at No. 8 Duke; Rivalry	W 65–62		Cameron Indoor Stadium; Durham, NC			
January 13		NC State	L 62–65		Woollen Gymnasium; Chapel Hill, NC			
January 16		at Virginia	W 87–80		Charlottesville, VA			
January 30		Maryland	L 81–90		Woollen Gymnasium; Chapel Hill, NC			
February 6*		vs. NYU	W 100–78		Greensboro, NC			
February 9		Wake Forest	W 107–91		Woollen Gymnasium; Chapel Hill, NC			
February 17		at NC State	W 69–68		Raleigh, NC			
February 19		vs. South Carolina; North-South Doubleheader	W 76–63		Charlotte, NC			
February 20		vs. Clemson; North-South Doubleheader	W 86–84		Charlotte, NC			
February 23		Virginia	W 105–101 ^{2OT}		Woollen Gymnasium; Chapel Hill, NC			
February 27		No. 5 Duke	W 71–66		Woollen Gymnasium; Charlotte, NC			
March 4*		vs. Wake Forest; ACC tournament	L 76–92		Raleigh, NC			
*Non-conference game. ^{#}Rankings from AP Poll. (#) Tournament seedings in parentheses.

- December 7 - Bobby Lewis scores 23 and Billy Cunningham adds 22 in the win over Kentucky, Dean Smith's first win over a ranked team.
- Following the loss to Wake Forest on January 6, the team bus returned home to find Dean Smith hung in effigy.
- The final home game against Duke was the last game played at Woollen Gymnasium and Billy Cunningham's final home game.

== Statistics ==
- Scoring: Billy Cunningham 25.4 ppg
- Rebounding: Billy Cunningham 14.3 rpg
