= 1964–65 Duke Blue Devils men's basketball team =

American college basketball season

1964–65 Duke Blue Devils men's basketball

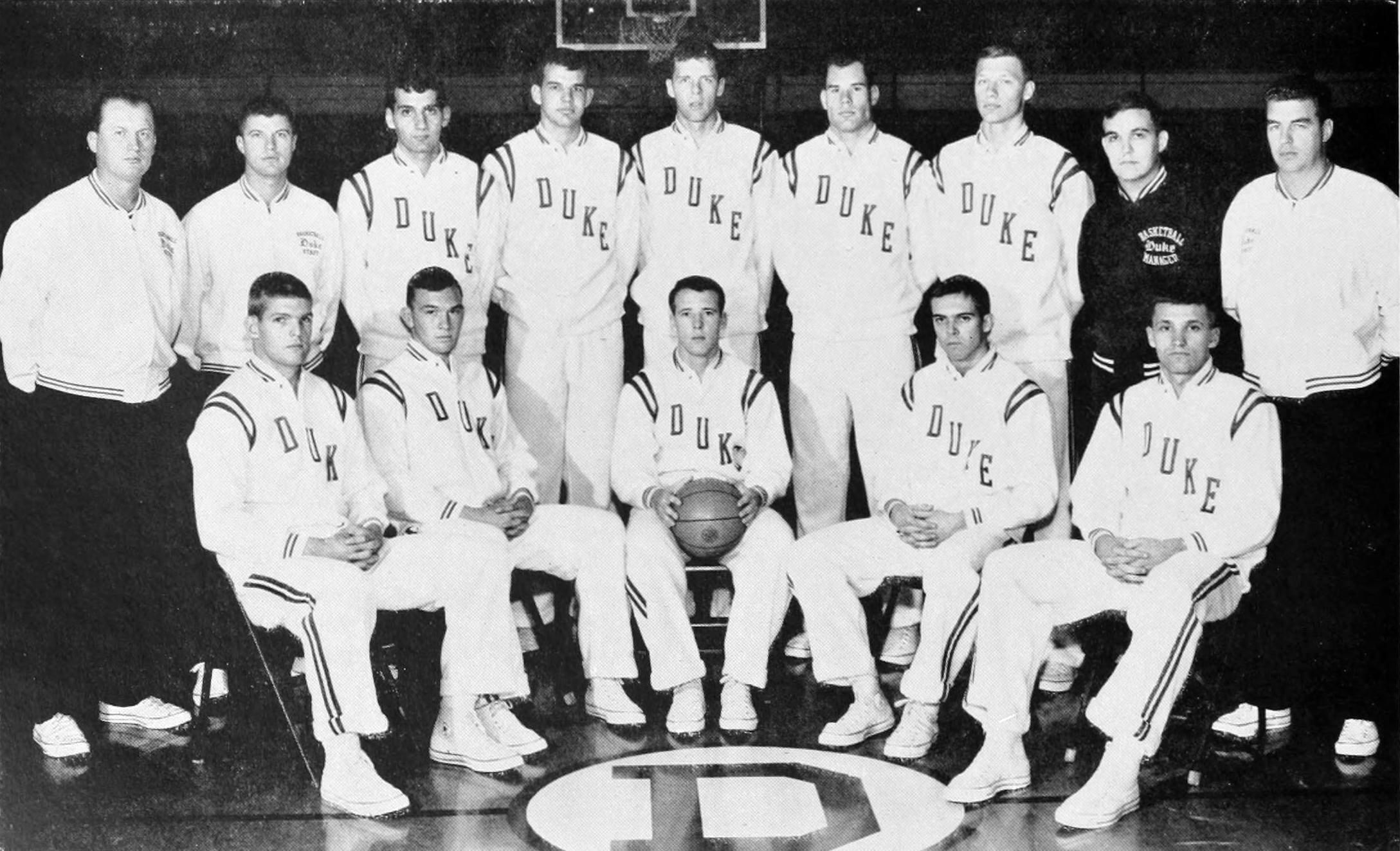

ACC Regular Season Champions
- Conference: Atlantic Coast Conference

Ranking
- Coaches: No. 9
- AP: No. 10
- Record: 20–5 (11–3 ACC)
- Head coach: Vic Bubas

1964–65 ACC men's basketball standings
	Conf.				Overall
Team	W		L	PCT	W		L	PCT
No. 10 Duke	11	–	3	.786	20	–	5	.800
NC State †	10	–	4	.714	21	–	5	.808
Maryland	10	–	4	.714	18	–	8	.692
North Carolina	10	–	4	.714	15	–	9	.625
Wake Forest	6	–	8	.429	12	–	15	.444
Clemson	4	–	10	.286	8	–	15	.348
Virginia	3	–	11	.214	7	–	18	.280
South Carolina	2	–	12	.143	6	–	17	.261
† 1965 ACC tournament winner Rankings from AP Poll

The 1964–65 Duke Blue Devils men's basketball team represented Duke University in the 1964–65 NCAA Division I men's basketball season. The head coach was Vic Bubas and the team finished the season with an overall record of 20–5 and did not qualify for the NCAA tournament.
