= Gary Thompson (basketball coach) =

American basketball coach

Biographical details
- Born: c. 1932
- Died: November 12, 2010 (aged 78)

Playing career
- 1951–1954: Wichita

Coaching career (HC unless noted)
- 1957–1964: Wichita (assistant)
- 1964–1971: Wichita State

Head coaching record
- Overall: 93–94
- Tournaments: 2–2 (NCAA University Division)

Accomplishments and honors

Championships
- MVC regular season (1965)

Gary Thompson (c. 1932 – November 12, 2010) was an American basketball coach. He served as the head basketball coach at Wichita State University from 1964 to 1971, compiling a record of 93–94. Thompson led the Wichita State Shockers to the Final Four of the 1965 NCAA University Division basketball tournament.

Thompson died on November 12, 2010.

== Head coaching record ==
Record table
Season	Team	Overall	Conference	Standing	Postseason
Wichita State Shockers (Missouri Valley Conference) (1964–1971)
1964–65	Wichita State	21–9	11–3	1st	NCAA University Division Fourth Place
1965–66	Wichita State	17–10	9–5	T–2nd	
1966–67	Wichita State	14–12	9–5	3rd	
1967–68	Wichita State	12–14	7–9	6th	
1968–69	Wichita State	11–15	7–9	T–6th	
1969–70	Wichita State	8–18	3–13	8th	
1970–71	Wichita State	10–16	3–11	8th	
Wichita State:		93–94	49–45		
Total:		93–94			
National champion Postseason invitational champion Conference regular season champion Conference regular season and conference tournament champion Division regular season champion Division regular season and conference tournament champion Conference tournament champion

== See also ==
- List of NCAA Division I Men's Final Four appearances by coach
