= 1965 ACC men's basketball tournament =

- Classification: Division I
- Season: 1964–65
- Teams: 8
- Site: Reynolds Coliseum; Raleigh, North Carolina
- Champions: NC State (5th title)
- Winning coach: Press Maravich (1st title)
- MVP: Larry Worsley (NC State)

1964–65 ACC men's basketball standings
	Conf.				Overall
Team	W		L	PCT	W		L	PCT
No. 10 Duke	11	–	3	.786	20	–	5	.800
NC State †	10	–	4	.714	21	–	5	.808
Maryland	10	–	4	.714	18	–	8	.692
North Carolina	10	–	4	.714	15	–	9	.625
Wake Forest	6	–	8	.429	12	–	15	.444
Clemson	4	–	10	.286	8	–	15	.348
Virginia	3	–	11	.214	7	–	18	.280
South Carolina	2	–	12	.143	6	–	17	.261
† 1965 ACC tournament winner Rankings from AP Poll

The 1965 Atlantic Coast Conference men's basketball tournament was held in Raleigh, North Carolina, at Reynolds Coliseum from March 4–6, 1965. NC State defeated Duke, 91–85, to win the championship. Larry Worsley of NC State was named tournament MVP.

== Bracket ==
Quarterfinals; March 4
1	#8 Duke	62
8	South Carolina	60
4	North Carolina	76
5	Wake Forest	92
2	NC State	106
7	Virginia	69
3	Maryland	61
6	Clemson	50

Semifinals; March 5
1	#8 Duke	101
5	Wake Forest	81
2	NC State	76
3	Maryland	67

Championship Game; March 6
1	#8 Duke	85
2	NC State	91
