= 1964–65 Princeton Tigers men's basketball team =

American college basketball season

1964–65 Princeton Tigers men's basketball

Ivy League Champion

1965 NCAA Men's Division I Tournament, 3rd place
- Conference: Ivy League
- Record: 23–6 (13–1, 1st Ivy League)
- Head coach: Butch van Breda Kolff
- Captain: Bill Bradley
- Home arena: Dillon Gymnasium

1964–65 Ivy League men's basketball standings
	Conf.				Overall
Team	W		L	PCT	W		L	PCT
Princeton	13	–	1	.929	23	–	6	.793
Cornell	11	–	3	.786	19	–	5	.792
Penn	10	–	4	.714	15	–	10	.600
Yale	7	–	7	.500	10	–	12	.455
Harvard	6	–	8	.429	11	–	12	.478
Columbia	5	–	9	.357	7	–	15	.318
Brown	3	–	11	.214	7	–	17	.292
Dartmouth	1	–	13	.071	4	–	21	.160
Rankings from AP Poll

The 1964–65 Princeton Tigers men's basketball team represented Princeton University in intercollegiate college basketball during the 1964–65 NCAA University Division men's basketball season. Butch van Breda Kolff served as head coach and the team captain was Bill Bradley. The team played its home games in the Dillon Gymnasium in Princeton, New Jersey. The team was the champion of the Ivy League, earning an invitation to the 23-team 1965 NCAA Division I men's basketball tournament.

The team posted a 23–6 overall record and a 13–1 conference record. The team won its NCAA Division I men's basketball tournament East region first round contest against the Penn State Nittany Lions by a 60–58 margin at The Palestra on March 8, 1965. Then in the East Regional at Cole Field House in College Park, Maryland, the team defeated NC State 66–48 on March 12 and Providence 109–69 on March 13. Then on March 19 in the national semifinal at the Memorial Coliseum Portland, Oregon, the team was defeated by the Cazzie Russell-led Michigan Wolverines 93–76 before beating the Wichita State Shockers 118–82 the following night. Bill Bradley earned the NCAA basketball tournament Most Outstanding Player award.

Bradley, who for third consecutive season led the conference in scoring with a 28.8 points per game average in conference games, was a first team All-Ivy League selection. In addition, Bradley was a repeat consensus first team 1965 NCAA Men's Basketball All-American selection by numerous panels: First team (Associated Press, United Press International, National Association of Basketball Coaches, United States Basketball Writers Association, Sporting News, Converse, NEA, Helms Foundation). Bradley also won a Rhodes Scholarship and was a territorial first round selection in the 1965 NBA draft by the New York Knicks. Bradley surpassed Arthur Loeb (1921–22 and 1922–23) and Cyril Haas (1915–16 and 1916–17) as the school's only three-time men's basketball All-American selection. Over the course of the season, Bradley won the national statistical championship for free throw percentage (88.6%, 273–308).

As a result of his performance against Wichita State in the final four, Bradley holds the following NCAA Division I men's basketball tournament records: single-game points scored in a final four (58), single-game field goals made in a final four (22), single-year two-game points scored in a final four (87), and single-year two-game field goals made in a final four (34). Additionally, Bradley formerly held the final four single-game free throw percentage record of 93.3% (minimum 10 made, 14–15), which was broken on March 23, 1972, and single-year two-game free throw percentage record 95.0% (minimum 12 made, 19–20), which was broken in 1972.

The team's performance against Wichita State established the current final four victory margin record (36) and the final four single-team single-half points scored record (65, tied). The team's performance formerly held two other final four records: single-half two-team points scored (108, broken March 25, 1972) and single-year two-game field goals made (78, broken in 1977).

Bradley continues to hold the single-game, single-season, and career total and average points Ivy League records. In addition, he holds the Ivy records for single-game, single-season, and career field goals made as well as single-season, and career free throws made. His career points, career average, career field goals achieved in 1965 surpassed Tony Lavelli (1949), Chet Forte (1957) and Ernie Beck (1953), respectively. His single-game points record surpassed Lavelli's 52 set on February 26, 1949. His 1965 career 87.6% free throw percentage, which surpassed Gus Broberg's 1941 mark of 85.8%, stood as the Ivy League record until it was eclipsed by Joe Hieser in 1968.

== Schedule and results ==
The team posted a 23–6 (13–1 Ivy League) record.

Date time, TV	Rank^{#}	Opponent^{#}	Result	Record	Site city, state
Regular season
Dec 2, 1964*		Lafayette	W 83–74	1–0	Dillon Gym; Princeton, New Jersey
Dec 5, 1964*		at Army	W 64–60	2–0	Gillis Field House; West Point, New York
Dec 8, 1964*		at Villanova	L 60–61 ^{OT}	2–1	Villanova Field House; Philadelphia, Pennsylvania
Dec 11, 1964*		Colgate	W 81–53	3–1	Dillon Gym; Princeton, New Jersey
Dec 12, 1964*		Navy	W 77–67	4–1	Dillon Gym; Princeton, New Jersey
Dec 14, 1964*		at Rutgers	W 92–79	5–1	College Avenue Gymnasium; Piscataway, New Jersey
Dec 17, 1964*		at No. 10 Saint Louis	L 71–90	5–2	Kiel Auditorium; St. Louis, Missouri
Dec 28, 1964*		vs. Syracuse; ECAC Holiday Classic	W 79–69	6–2	Madison Square Garden; New York, New York
Dec 30, 1964*		vs. No. 1 Michigan; ECAC Holiday Classic	L 78–80	6–3	Madison Square Garden; New York, New York
Jan 2, 1965*		at Cincinnati	L 69–71	6–4	Armory Fieldhouse; Cincinnati, Ohio
Jan 8, 1965		Yale	W 57–56	7–4 (1–0)	Dillon Gym; Princeton, New Jersey
Jan 9, 1965		Brown	W 80–58	8–4 (2–0)	Dillon Gym; Princeton, New Jersey
Jan 15, 1965		at Columbia	W 78–68	9–4 (3–0)	University Gymnasium; New York, New York
Jan 16, 1965		at Cornell	L 69–70	9–5 (3–1)	Barton Hall; Ithaca, New York
Jan 30, 1965		at Penn	W 83–72	10–5 (4–1)	The Palestra; Philadelphia, Pennsylvania
Feb 5, 1965		at Brown	W 69–49	11–5 (5–1)	Marvel Gymnasium; Providence, Rhode Island
Feb 6, 1965		at Yale	W 67–62	12–5 (6–1)	John J. Lee Amphitheater; New Haven, Connecticut
Feb 12, 1965		Harvard	W 76–55	13–5 (7–1)	Dillon Gym; Princeton, New Jersey
Feb 13, 1965		Dartmouth	W 103–64	14–5 (8–1)	Dillon Gym; Princeton, New Jersey
Feb 19, 1965		at Dartmouth	W 83–57	15–5 (9–1)	Alumni Gym; Hanover, New Hampshire
Feb 20, 1965		at Harvard	W 82–72	16–5 (10–1)	Lavietes Pavilion; Cambridge, Massachusetts
Feb 26, 1965		Columbia	W 93–60	17–5 (11–1)	Dillon Gym; Princeton, New Jersey
Feb 27, 1965		Cornell	W 107–84	18–5 (12–1)	Dillon Gym; Princeton, New Jersey
Mar 3, 1965		Penn	W 81–71	19–5 (13–1)	Dillon Gym; Princeton, New Jersey
NCAA tournament
Mar 8, 1965*		vs. Penn State; First round	W 60–58	20–5	The Palestra; Philadelphia, Pennsylvania
Mar 12, 1965*		vs. NC State; Regional Semifinal – Sweet Sixteen	W 66–48	21–5	Cole Fieldhouse; College Park, Maryland
Mar 13, 1965*		vs. No. 4 Providence; Regional final – Elite Eight	W 109–69	22–5	Cole Fieldhouse; College Park, Maryland
Mar 19, 1965*		vs. No. 1 Michigan; National Semifinal – Final Four	L 76–93	22–6	Memorial Coliseum; Portland, Oregon
Mar 20, 1965*		vs. Wichita State; National Consolation	W 118–82	23–6	Memorial Coliseum; Portland, Oregon
*Non-conference game. ^{#}Rankings from AP Poll. (#) Tournament seedings in parentheses.

== NCAA tournament ==
The team advanced to the 1965 NCAA Division I men's basketball tournament Final four.

3/8/65 in Philadelphia, Pa.: Princeton 60, Penn State 58

East Regional

3/12/65 in College Park, Md.: Princeton 66, N.C. State 48
3/13/65 in College Park, Md.: Princeton 109, Providence 69

Final Four

3/19/65 in Portland, Ore.: Michigan 93, Princeton 76
3/20/65 in Portland, Ore.: Princeton 118, Wichita State 82

== Awards and honors ==
- Bill Bradley
  - NCAA basketball tournament Most Outstanding Player
  - Ivy League Scoring Champion
  - First Team All-Ivy League
  - 1965 NCAA Men's Basketball All-American (consensus)
  - All-East
- Gary Walters
  - Honorable Mention All-Ivy League
- Ed Hummer
  - Honorable Mention All-Ivy League

== Team players drafted into the NBA ==
Two players from this team were selected in the NBA draft.

Year	Round	Pick	Player	NBA club
1965	1	2	Bill Bradley	New York Knicks
1967	6	17	Ed Hummer	Boston Celtics

Future Major League Baseball (MLB) executive Larry Lucchino was a reserve on the team.
