= 1965 National Invitation Tournament =

Annual NCAA basketball competition

- Season: 1964–65
- Teams: 14
- Finals site: Madison Square Garden, New York City
- Champions: St. John's Red Storm (4th title)
- Runner-up: Villanova Wildcats (1st title game)
- Semifinalists: Army Black Knights (2nd semifinal); NYU Violets (5th semifinal)
- Winning coach: Joe Lapchick (2nd title)
- MVP: Ken McIntyre (St. John's)

The National Invitation Tournament was originated by the Metropolitan Basketball Writers Association in 1938. Responsibility for its administration was transferred two years later to local colleges, first known as the Metropolitan Intercollegiate Basketball Committee and in 1948, as the Metropolitan Intercollegiate Basketball Association (MIBA), which comprised representatives from five New York City schools: Fordham University, Manhattan College, New York University, St. John's University, and Wagner College. Originally all of the teams qualifying for the tournament were invited to New York City, and all games were played at Madison Square Garden.

The tournament originally consisted of only six teams, which later expanded to eight teams in 1941, 12 teams in 1949, 14 teams in 1965, 16 teams in 1968, 24 teams in 1979, 32 teams in 1980, and 40 teams from 2002 through 2006. In 2007, the tournament reverted to the current 32-team format.

== Selected teams ==
Below is a list of the 14 teams selected for the tournament.

- Army
- Boston College
- Bradley
- Detroit
- Fordham
- La Salle
- Manhattan
- New Mexico
- NYU
- St. John's
- Saint Louis
- Texas Western
- Villanova
- Western Kentucky

== Bracket ==
Below is the tournament bracket.

First Round
Manhattan	71
Texas Western	53
Detroit	93
La Salle	86
NYU	71
Bradley	70
St. John's	114
Boston College	92
Army	70
Saint Louis	66
Western Kentucky	57
Fordham	53

Quarterfinals
Manhattan	71
Villanova	73
Detroit	76
NYU	87
St. John's	61
New Mexico	54
Army	58
Western Kentucky	54

Semifinals
Villanova	91
NYU	69
St. John's	67
Army	60

Finals
Villanova	51
St. John's	55

Third place game
NYU	74
Army	75

== See also ==
- 1965 NCAA University Division basketball tournament
- 1965 NCAA College Division basketball tournament
- 1965 NAIA Division I men's basketball tournament
