= Powerlifting at the 2004 Summer Paralympics – Women's 48 kg =

Women's Up To 48 kg at the XII Paralympic Games
- Paralympic Powerlifting
- Venue: Nikaia Olympic Weightlifting Hall
- Dates: 21 September 2004
- Competitors: 8 from 8 nations
- Winning weight(kg): 118.0

Medalists
1st place, gold medalist(s)		Bian Jianxin	China
2nd place, silver medalist(s)		Amalia Perez Vazquez	Mexico
3rd place, bronze medalist(s)		Olena Kiseolar	Ukraine

The Women's 48 kg powerlifting event at the 2004 Summer Paralympics was competed on 21 September. It was won by Bian Jian Xin, representing China.

== Final round ==
21 Sept. 2004, 13:00

Rank	Athlete	Weight(kg)	Notes
1st place, gold medalist(s)	Bian Jianxin (CHN)	118.0	WR
2nd place, silver medalist(s)	Amalia Pérez (MEX)	110.0	
3rd place, bronze medalist(s)	Olena Kiseolar (UKR)	95.0	
4	Somkhoun Anon (THA)	85.0	
5	Hoang Tyuet Loan Chau (VIE)	80.0	
6	Anna Oroszova (SVK)	75.0	
7	Julie Salmon (GBR)	72.5	
8	Saleha Annab (ALG)	67.5	
