= Olena Kiseolar =

Ukrainian Paralympic powerlifter

Sport
- Country: Ukraine
- Sport: Paralympic powerlifting
Medal record
Paralympic Games
Bronze medal – third place	2004 Athens	48 kg

Olena Kiseolar is a Ukrainian Paralympic powerlifter. She represented Ukraine at the 2004 Summer Paralympics held in Athens, Greece and she won the bronze medal in the women's 48 kg event.
