= Patience Aghimile Igbiti =

Nigerian Paralympic powerlifter

Personal information
- Nationality: Nigerian
Medal record
Representing Nigeria
Women's powerlifting
Paralympic Games
Silver medal – second place	2004 Athens	56 kg
Bronze medal – third place	2008 Beijing	60 kg

Patience Aghimile Igbiti is a Nigerian Paralympian coach and former powerlifter. In 2008, she won the bronze medal in the women's 60 kg powerlifting category at Beijing 2008. After her retirement, she became a Paralympic coach and was part of Team Nigeria's coaching crew for the 2016 Summer Paralympics.
