= Bian Jianxin =

Chinese Paralympic powerlifter

Sport
- Country: China
- Sport: Paralympic powerlifting
Medal record
Paralympic Games
Gold medal – first place	2000 Sydney	40 kg
Gold medal – first place	2004 Athens	48 kg
Gold medal – first place	2008 Beijing	60 kg

Bian Jianxin is a Chinese Paralympic powerlifter. She represented China at the Summer Paralympics in 2000, 2004 and 2008 and in total she won three gold medals. She won the gold medal in the women's 40 kg event in 2000, in the women's 48 kg event in 2004 and in the women's 60 kg event in 2008.
