= 1964–65 NCAA University Division men's basketball rankings =

- Season: 1964–65
- NCAA Tournament: 1965
- Preseason No. 1: Michigan
- NCAA Tournament Champions: UCLA
NCAA University Division men's basketball rankings
| |

The 1964–65 NCAA men's basketball rankings was made up of two human polls, the AP Poll and the Coaches Poll.

== Legend ==
| | Increase in ranking |
| | Decrease in ranking |
| | New to rankings from previous week |
| Italics | Number of first place votes |
| (#–#) | Win–loss record |
| т | Tied with team above or below also with this symbol |

== AP Poll ==
The preseason AP poll included 20 ranked teams, while AP polls for the remainder of the season included only 10 ranked teams.

| | Preseason | Week 2 Dec. 7 | Week 3 Dec. 14 | Week 4 Dec. 21 | Week 5 Dec. 28 | Week 6 Jan. 4 | Week 7 Jan. 11 | Week 8 Jan. 18 | Week 9 Jan. 25 | Week 10 Feb. 1 | Week 11 Feb. 8 | Week 12 Feb. 15 | Week 13 Feb. 22 | Week 14 Mar. 1 | Final Mar. 8 | |
|---|---|---|---|---|---|---|---|---|---|---|---|---|---|---|---|---|
| 1. | Michigan | Michigan (3–0) | Wichita State (4–0) | Michigan (5–1) | Michigan (6–1) | UCLA (9–1) | UCLA (11–1) | UCLA (13–1) | UCLA (14–1) | Michigan (13–2) | Michigan (13–2) | Michigan (15–2) (23) | Michigan (17–2) | Michigan (19–2) | Michigan (21–2) | 1. |
| 2. | UCLA | Wichita State (1–0) | Michigan (4–1) | Wichita State (5–1) | Wichita State (6–1) | Indiana (9–1) | Michigan (9–2) | Michigan (10–2) | Michigan (11–2) | UCLA (14–2) | UCLA (15–2) | UCLA (18–2) (5) | UCLA (20–2) | UCLA (22–2) | UCLA (24–2) | 2. |
| 3. | Wichita State | Vanderbilt (2–0) | San Francisco (4–0) | Minnesota (5–0) | Minnesota (6–0) | Michigan (8–2) | Wichita State (10–2) | Saint Joseph's (14–1) | Saint Joseph's (15–1) | Saint Joseph's (17–1) | Saint Joseph's (19–1) | Providence (18–0) (5) | Saint Joseph's (23–1) | Saint Joseph's (24–1) | Saint Joseph's (25–1) | 3. |
| 4. | Davidson | Saint Louis (3–0) | Minnesota (4–0) | UCLA (5–1) | UCLA (6–1) | Saint Joseph's (10–1) | Saint Joseph's (12–1) | Wichita State (12–2) | Providence (12–0) | Providence (14–0) | Providence (16–0) | Saint Joseph's (19–1) | Providence (19–0) | Providence (20–1) | Providence (22–1) | 4. |
| 5. | Duke | San Francisco (2–0) | UCLA (3–1) | San Francisco (5–0) | San Francisco (6–0) | Wichita State (9–2) | Indiana (10–1) | Indiana (12–2) | Wichita State (12–2) | Davidson (16–1) | Davidson (18–1) | Davidson (21–1) | Duke (18–2) | Vanderbilt (20–3) | Vanderbilt (22–3) | 5. |
| 6. | Vanderbilt | Minnesota (3–0) | Duke (3–1) | Duke (5–1) | Illinois (7–1) | Duke (7–1) | Providence (11–0) | Providence (11–0) | Davidson (14–1) | Duke (10–2) | Duke (13–2) | Duke (16–2) | Davidson (23–1) | Minnesota (17–4) | Davidson (24–2) | 6. |
| 7. | Syracuse | UCLA (1–1) | St. John's (3–0) | Illinois (6–1) | Indiana (7–0) | St. John's (7–2) | St. John's (9–2) | Davidson (14–1) | St. John's (12–2) | Indiana (12–2) | Vanderbilt (15–2) | Indiana (15–2) | Indiana (16–3) | Davidson (24–2) | Minnesota (18–5) | 7. |
| 8. | Kansas State | Duke (1–1) | Kentucky (3–1) | Indiana (6–0) | Duke (5–1) | San Francisco (8–1) | Davidson (11–1) | St. John's (11–2) | San Francisco (12–1) | Wichita State (13–3) | Indiana (13–2) | Tennessee (17–2) | Minnesota (16–3) | Duke (18–4) | Villanova (21–4) | 8. |
| 9. | San Francisco | Kentucky (1–1) | Vanderbilt (3–1) | Saint Louis (5–1) | Saint Louis (6–1) | Providence (9–0) | San Francisco (10–1) | San Francisco (12–1) | Indiana (12–2) | Vanderbilt (14–2) | Wichita State (14–3) | Minnesota (14–3) | Vanderbilt (18–3) | Villanova (19–4) | BYU (21–5) | 9. |
| 10. | St. John's | St. John's (1–0) | Saint Louis (3–1) | Davidson (5–1) | Saint Joseph's (6–0) | Davidson (10–1) | Duke (8–2) | Duke (10–2) | Duke (10–2) | San Francisco (13–2) | Illinois (12–3) | Wichita State (15–4) | New Mexico (19–3) | BYU (19–5) | Duke (20–5) | 10. |
| 11. | Minnesota т | | | | | | | | | | | | | | | 11. |
| 12. | Kentucky т | | | | | | | | | | | | | | | 12. |
| 13. | North Carolina | | | | | | | | | | | | | | | 13. |
| 14. | Bradley | | | | | | | | | | | | | | | 14. |
| 15. | Seattle | | | | | | | | | | | | | | | 15. |
| 16. | Villanova | | | | | | | | | | | | | | | 16. |
| 17. | Notre Dame | | | | | | | | | | | | | | | 17. |
| 18. | Kansas | | | | | | | | | | | | | | | 18. |
| 19. | BYU | | | | | | | | | | | | | | | 19. |
| 20. | DePaul | | | | | | | | | | | | | | | 20. |
| | Preseason | Week 2 Dec. 7 | Week 3 Dec. 14 | Week 4 Dec. 21 | Week 5 Dec. 28 | Week 6 Jan. 4 | Week 7 Jan. 11 | Week 8 Jan. 18 | Week 9 Jan. 25 | Week 10 Feb. 1 | Week 11 Feb. 8 | Week 12 Feb. 15 | Week 13 Feb. 22 | Week 14 Mar. 1 | Final Mar. 8 | |
| | | Dropped: Davidson (1–1); Syracuse; Kansas State; North Carolina (3–1); Bradley; Seattle; Villanova (2–0); Notre Dame (2–0); Kansas (2–1); BYU (2–0); DePaul | None | Dropped: St. John's (4–1); Kentucky (4–2); Vanderbilt (5–2) | Dropped: Davidson (6–1) | Dropped: Minnesota (7–2); Illinois (7–2); Saint Louis (8–2) | None | None | None | Dropped: St. John's (12–3) | Dropped: San Francisco (15–3) | Dropped: Vanderbilt (16–3); Illinois (13–4) | Dropped: Tennessee (17–3); Wichita State (17–5) | Dropped: Indiana (17–5); New Mexico (19–5) | None | |

== UPI Poll ==
| | Preseason | Week 1 Dec. 8 | Week 2 Dec. 15 | Week 3 Dec. 22 | Week 4 Dec. 29 | Week 5 Jan. 5 | Week 6 Jan. 12 | Week 7 Jan. 19 | Week 8 Jan. 26 | Week 9 Feb. 2 | Week 10 Feb. 9 | Week 11 Feb. 16 | Week 12 Feb. 23 | Week 13 Mar. 2 | Final Mar. 9 | |
|---|---|---|---|---|---|---|---|---|---|---|---|---|---|---|---|---|
| 1. | Michigan | Michigan (3–0) | Wichita State (4–0) | Michigan (5–1) | Michigan (6–1) | UCLA (9–1) | UCLA (11–1) | UCLA (13–1) | UCLA (14–1) | Michigan (13–2) | Michigan (13–2) | Michigan (15–2) | Michigan (17–2) | Michigan (19–2) | Michigan (21–2) | 1. |
| 2. | UCLA | Vanderbilt (2–0) | Michigan (4–1) | Wichita State (5–1) | Wichita State (6–1) | Michigan (8–2) | Michigan (9–2) | Michigan (10–2) | Michigan (11–2) | UCLA (14–2) | UCLA (15–2) | UCLA (18–2) | UCLA (20–2) | UCLA (22–2) | UCLA (24–2) | 2. |
| 3. | Davidson | Wichita State (1–0) | San Francisco (4–0) | Minnesota (5–0) | Minnesota (6–0) | Indiana (9–1) т | Wichita State (10–2) | Wichita State (12–2) | Wichita State (12–2) | Saint Joseph's (17–1) | Saint Joseph's (19–1) | Saint Joseph's (19–1) | Saint Joseph's (23–1) | Saint Joseph's (24–1) | Saint Joseph's (25–1) | 3. |
| 4. | Wichita State | Saint Louis (3–0) | Minnesota (4–0) | San Francisco (5–0) | San Francisco (6–0) | Wichita State (9–2) т | Indiana (10–1) | Saint Joseph's (14–1) | Saint Joseph's (15–1) | Providence (14–0) | Providence (16–0) | Providence (18–0) | Providence (19–0) | Providence (20–1) | Providence (22–1) | 4. |
| 5. | Duke | Minnesota (3–0) | UCLA (3–1) | UCLA (5–1) | UCLA (6–1) | Duke (7–1) | St. Joseph's (12–1) | Indiana (12–2) | Providence (12–0) | Wichita State (13–3) | Vanderbilt (15–2) | Duke (16–2) | Duke (18–2) | Vanderbilt (20–3) | Vanderbilt (22–3) | 5. |
| 6. | Vanderbilt | San Francisco (2–0) | Duke (3–1) т | Duke (5–1) | Indiana (7–0) | Saint Joseph's (10–1) | Providence (11–0) | San Francisco (12–1) | San Francisco (12–1) | Davidson (16–1) | Davidson (18–1) | Davidson (21–1) | Davidson (23–1) | Duke (18–4) | BYU (21–5) | 6. |
| 7. | San Francisco | Duke (1–1) | Vanderbilt (3–1) т | Saint Louis (5–1) | Duke (5–1) | San Francisco (8–1) | San Francisco (10–1) | Providence (11–0) | Davidson (14–1) | Vanderbilt (14–2) | Duke (13–2) | Wichita State (15–4) | Minnesota (16–3) | Davidson (24–2) | Davidson (24–2) | 7. |
| 8. | North Carolina | UCLA (1–1) | Saint Louis (3–1) | Indiana (6–0) | Illinois (7–1) | St. John's (7–2) | St. John's (9–2) | Davidson (14–1) | St. John's (12–2) | Duke (10–2) | Wichita State (14–3) | Vanderbilt (16–3) | Vanderbilt (18–3) | Minnesota (17–4) | Minnesota (18–5) | 8. |
| 9. | Seattle | BYU (2–0) | Kentucky (3–1) | Illinois (6–1) | Saint Louis (6–1) | Illinois (7–2) | Davidson (11–1) | St. John's (11–2) | Duke (10–2) | San Francisco (13–2) | Indiana (13–2) | Indiana (15–2) | Indiana (16–3) | BYU (19–5) | Duke (20–5) | 9. |
| 10. | Minnesota | Kentucky (1–1) | Indiana (4–0) | Davidson (5–1) | Davidson (6–1) | Davidson (10–1) | Vanderbilt (11–2) | Duke (10–2) | Indiana (12–2) | Indiana (12–2) | Illinois (12–3) | Tennessee (17–2) | Wichita State (17–5) | San Francisco (21–4) | San Francisco (23–4) | 10. |
| 11. | Kansas | Davidson (1–1) | St. John's (3–0) | Vanderbilt (5–2) | Saint Joseph's (6–0) | Minnesota (7–2) | Duke (8–2) | Vanderbilt (12–2) | Vanderbilt (12–2) | St. John's (12–3) | Iowa (11–5) | Minnesota (14–3) | San Francisco (19–3) | Illinois (16–5) | Villanova (21–4) | 11. |
| 12. | Syracuse | Villanova (2–0) | Saint Joseph's (4–0) | St. John's (4–1) т | Vanderbilt (6–2) | Providence (9–0) т | Illinois (9–3) | Illinois (10–3) | Illinois (10–3) | Illinois (11–3) | San Francisco (15–3) | San Francisco (17–3) | Tennessee (17–3) | Villanova (19–4) | NC State (21–5) | 12. |
| 13. | Villanova | St. John's (1–0) | Davidson (3–1) | Saint Joseph's (6–0) т | Villanova (8–0) | Vanderbilt (9–2) т | New Mexico (12–1) | Tennessee (10–2) | Tennessee (12–2) | Iowa (10–5) | New Mexico (16–2) | New Mexico (18–2) | Illinois (15–4) | Wichita State (17–6) | Oklahoma State (19–6) | 13. |
| 14. | Kansas State | Illinois (1–1) | Penn State (3–1) | Villanova (5–0) т | Tennessee (5–0) | Utah (10–1) | Kansas (10–3) | DePaul (12–2) | New Mexico (12–2) | Arizona (14–4) т | BYU (15–4) | Illinois (13–4) | New Mexico (19–3) | Indiana (17–5) т | Wichita State (18–7) | 14. |
| 15. | St. John's т | Saint Joseph's (2–0) | Illinois (3–1) | Tennessee (4–0) | Utah (8–0) | Saint Louis (8–2) | Minnesota (9–2) | Kansas (11–4) т | Minnesota (11–3) | New Mexico (14–2) т | Tennessee (15–2) | BYU (16–5) | BYU (17–5) | New Mexico (19–5) т | Connecticut (23–2) | 15. |
| 16. | Kentucky т | Miami (FL) (3–0) | Villanova (4–0) | Kentucky (4–2) т | Kansas (6–3) | Kansas (8–3) | BYU (9–3) | New Mexico (12–2) т | NC State (11–1) | Oklahoma State (13–4) т | St. John's (13–4) | Villanova (17–3) | St. John's (15–6) | Connecticut (21–2) | Illinois (17–6) | 16. |
| 17. | BYU | Notre Dame (2–0) | Nebraska (3–1) | Utah (6–0) т | BYU (5–2) | New Mexico (10–1) | Saint Louis (11–3) | Oklahoma State (10–4) | Oklahoma State (11–4) | Tennessee (13–2) | Villanova (15–3) | Oklahoma State (15–5) | Miami (FL) (20–4) | Tennessee (18–4) | Tennessee (19–5) | 17. |
| 18. | Saint Louis | Kansas (2–1) | Bradley (4–0) | BYU (4–2) т | Kansas State (6–3) | DePaul (9–2) т | Kentucky (6–5) | NC State (10–1) | BYU (11–4) | NC State (12–1) | Miami (FL) (16–4) т | NC State (14–3) | Kansas (17–7) т | Oklahoma State (17–6) т | Indiana (18–5) | 18. |
| 19. | Notre Dame | North Carolina (3–1) | Notre Dame (4–1) | Colorado State (5–2) т | Kentucky (4–3) т | Kentucky (5–4) т | Miami (OH) (10–1) | Miami (FL) (11–3) т | DePaul (13–3) | BYU (13–4) | Minnesota (13–3) т | Arizona (15–6) т | Oklahoma State (15–6) т | Penn State (19–3) т | Miami (OH) (20–5) | 19. |
| 20. | DePaul | Utah State (3–0) | BYU (2–2) | New Mexico (6–1) т | New Mexico (7–1) т Seattle (6–4) т | Bradley (8–3) т BYU (7–3) т | Tennessee (8–2) | St. Bonaventure (9–2) т | Miami (OH) (13–1) | DePaul (14–3) т St. Bonaventure (10–4) т | NC State (13–2) т | Kansas (14–6) т Miami (FL) (18–4) т | Villanova (17–4) т | Kansas (18–7) т NC State (17–4) т | Dayton (20–6) | 20. |
| | Preseason | Week 1 Dec. 8 | Week 2 Dec. 15 | Week 3 Dec. 22 | Week 4 Dec. 29 | Week 5 Jan. 5 | Week 6 Jan. 12 | Week 7 Jan. 19 | Week 8 Jan. 26 | Week 9 Feb. 2 | Week 10 Feb. 9 | Week 11 Feb. 16 | Week 12 Feb. 23 | Week 13 Mar. 2 | Final Mar. 9 | |
| | | Dropped: Seattle; Syracuse; Kansas State; DePaul | Dropped: Miami (FL); Kansas; North Carolina; Utah State | Dropped: Penn State; Nebraska; Bradley; Notre Dame | Dropped: St. John's; Colorado State | Dropped: Villanova; Tennessee; Kansas State; Seattle | Dropped: Utah; DePaul; Bradley | Dropped: Minnesota; BYU; Saint Louis; Kentucky; Miami (OH) | Dropped: Kansas; Miami (FL); St. Bonaventure | Dropped: Miami(OH) | Dropped: Arizona; Oklahoma State; DePaul; St. Bonaventure | Dropped: St. John's (13–6); Iowa | Dropped: NC State; Arizona | Dropped: St. John's; Miami (FL) | Dropped: New Mexico; Penn State; Kansas | |
