= 1964–65 Ohio Bobcats men's basketball team =

American college basketball season

1964–65 Ohio Bobcats men's basketball

MAC Regular Season champions

NCAA tournament, First Round
- Conference: Mid-American Conference
- Record: 19–7 (11–1 MAC)
- Head coach: Jim Snyder (16th season)
- Home arena: Grover Center

1964–65 Mid-American Conference men's basketball standings
	Conf.				Overall
Team	W		L	PCT	W		L	PCT
Ohio	11	–	1	.917	19	–	7	.731
Miami (Ohio)	11	–	1	.917	20	–	5	.800
Toledo	6	–	6	.500	13	–	11	.542
Bowling Green State	6	–	6	.500	9	–	15	.375
Kent State	4	–	8	.333	9	–	11	.450
Western Michigan	3	–	9	.250	8	–	16	.333
Marshall	1	–	11	.083	4	–	20	.167
Rankings from AP Poll

The 1964–65 Ohio Bobcats men's basketball team represented Ohio University as a member of the Mid-American Conference in the college basketball season of 1964–65. The team was coached by Jim Snyder and played their home games at Grover Center. The Bobcats finished the regular season with a record of 19–6 and won MAC regular season title with a conference record of 11–1. They received a bid to the NCAA tournament. There they lost to Dayton in the First Round.

== Schedule ==
Date time, TV	Rank^{#}	Opponent^{#}	Result	Record	Site (attendance) city, state
Regular Season
12/1/1964*		at Indiana	L 70–81	0–1	
12/5/1964*		at Northern Illinois	W 93–86	1–1	
12/12/1964		at Marshall	W 106–81	2–1 (1–0)	
12/15/1964		at West Virginia Wesleyan	W 91–73	3–1	
12/21/1964*		at Purdue	L 73–79	3–2	
12/23/1964*		at Northwestern	W 88–67	4–2	
12/28/1964*		vs. Duquesne; Charlotte Invitational	W 73–50	5–2	
12/29/1964*		vs. Davidson; Charlotte Invitational	L 63–81	5–3	
MAC regular season
1/2/1965		at Bowling Green	W 84–69	6–3 (2–0)	
1/6/1965		at Western Michigan	W 91–70	7–3 (3–0)	
1/9/1965		Toledo	W 86–69	8–3 (4–0)	
1/13/1965		at Miami (OH)	L 48–58	8–4 (4–1)	
1/18/1965		at Florida Southern	W 106–69	9–4	
1/23/1965		Western Michigan	W 89–76	10–4 (5–1)	
1/30/1965		at Kent State	W 72–70	11-4 (6–1)	
2/3/1965		at San Francisco State	W 95–75	12-4	
2/6/1965		Bowling Green	W 77–60	13–4 (7–1)	
2/10/1965		Marshall	W 103–85	14–4 (8–1)	
2/13/1965*		at Notre Dame	L 86–94	14–5	
2/17/1965		Miami (OH)	W 65–55	15–5 (9–1)	
2/22/1965		Southern Illinois	L 59–79	15–6 (9–1)	
2/22/1965*		Loyola (IL)	W 84–76	16–6	
2/27/1965		Kent State	W 95–75	17–6 (10–1)	
3/6/1965		at Toledo	W 87–61	18–6 (11–1)	
3/8/1965		vs. Miami (OH)	W 76–71	19–6 (12–1)	
NCAA tournament
3/9/1965*		vs. Dayton	L 65–66	19–7	
*Non-conference game. ^{#}Rankings from AP Poll. (#) Tournament seedings in parentheses. All times are in Eastern Time.

== Statistics ==
=== Team statistics ===
Final 1964–65 statistics

Record	Ohio	OPP
Scoring	2127	1892
Scoring Average	81.81	72.77
Field goals – Att	851–1899	725–1821
Free throws – Att	425–653	462–664
Rebounds	1478	1106
Assists		
Turnovers		
Steals		
Blocked Shots		

=== Player statistics ===
			Minutes		Scoring		Total FGs			Free-Throws			Rebounds						
Player	GP	GS	Tot	Avg	Pts	Avg	FG	FGA	Pct	FT	FTA	Pct	Tot	Avg	A	PF	TO	Stl	Blk
Don Hilt	26	-			493	19.0	191	408	0.468	111	151	0.735	306	11.8		71			
Mike Haley	26	-			432	16.6	187	410	0.456	58	103	0.563	235	9.0		55			
Mike Hammond	26	-			306	11.8	121	260	0.465	64	78	0.821	98	3.8		75			
John Schroeder	26	-			276	10.6	107	260	0.412	62	120	0.517	302	11.6		81			
Tom Davis	26	-			192	7.4	66	162	0.407	60	80	0.750	103	4.0		67			
Dave Brown	26	-			177	6.8	80	151	0.530	17	40	0.425	65	2.5		59			
Joe Barry		-																	
Lloyd Buck		-																	
Ken Fowlkes		-																	
_ Hamilton		-																	
_ Reichenbach		-																	
_ Spires		-																	
Tom Weirich		-																	
_ Williams		-																	
Total	26	-	-	-	2127	81.8	851	1899	0.448	425	653	0.651	1478	56.8		491			
Opponents	26	-	-	-	1892	72.8	725	1821	0.398	462	664	0.696	1106	42.5		483			

Legend
GP	Games played	GS	Games started	Avg	Average per game
FG	Field-goals made	FGA	Field-goal attempts	Off	Offensive rebounds
Def	Defensive rebounds	A	Assists	TO	Turnovers
Blk	Blocks	Stl	Steals	High	Team high
