= 1965 NCAA University Division basketball tournament =

Edition of USA college basketball tournament

- Season: 1964–65
- Teams: 23
- Finals site: Memorial Coliseum, Portland, Oregon
- Champions: UCLA Bruins (2nd title, 2nd title game, 3rd Final Four)
- Runner-up: Michigan Wolverines (1st title game, 2nd Final Four)
- Semifinalists: Princeton Tigers (1st Final Four); Wichita State Shockers (1st Final Four)
- Winning coach: John Wooden (2nd title)
- MOP: Bill Bradley (Princeton)
- Attendance: 140,673
- Top scorer: Bill Bradley (Princeton) (177 points)

The 1965 NCAA University Division basketball tournament involved 23 schools playing in single-elimination play to determine the national champion of men's NCAA Division I college basketball. The 27th annual edition of the tournament began on March 8, 1965, and ended with the championship game on March 20, at the Memorial Coliseum in Portland, Oregon. A total of 27 games were played, including a third-place game in each region and a national third-place game.

Second-ranked UCLA, coached by John Wooden, won the national title with a 91–80 victory in the final game over #1 Michigan, coached by Dave Strack. Bill Bradley of Princeton was named the tournament's Most Outstanding Player.

UCLA finished the season with 28 wins and two defeats. In the championship game, the Bruins shot 56.9% with Gail Goodrich's 42 points and Kenny Washington's 17 points to become the fifth team to win consecutive championships.

Of note, this was the last NCAA Tournament for Henry Iba of Oklahoma State.

== Locations ==
First round (green), Regionals (blue), and Final Four (red)

Round	Region	Location	Venue
First Round	East	Philadelphia, Pennsylvania	The Palestra
First Round	Mideast	Bowling Green, Kentucky	E. A. Diddle Arena
First Round	Midwest & West	Lubbock, Texas	Lubbock Municipal Coliseum
Regionals	East	College Park, Maryland	Cole Field House
Regionals	Mideast	Lexington, Kentucky	Memorial Coliseum
Regionals	Midwest	Manhattan, Kansas	Ahearn Field House
Regionals	West	Provo, Utah	Smith Fieldhouse
Final Four		Portland, Oregon	Memorial Coliseum

== Teams ==
Region	Team	Coach	Conference	Finished	Final Opponent	Score
East
East	Connecticut	Fred Shabel	Yankee	First round	Saint Joseph's	L 67–61
East	NC State	Press Maravich	Atlantic Coast	Regional third place	Saint Joseph's	W 103–81
East	Penn State	John Egli	Independent	First round	Princeton	L 60–58
East	Princeton	Butch van Breda Kolff	Ivy League	Third Place	Wichita State	W 118–82
East	Providence	Joe Mullaney	Independent	Regional Runner-up	Princeton	L 109–69
East	Saint Joseph's	Jack Ramsay	Middle Atlantic	Regional Fourth Place	NC State	L 103–81
East	West Virginia	George King	Southern	First round	Providence	L 91–67
Mideast
Mideast	Dayton	Don Donoher	Independent	Regional third place	DePaul	W 75–69
Mideast	DePaul	Ray Meyer	Independent	Regional Fourth Place	Dayton	L 75–69
Mideast	Eastern Kentucky	Jim Baechtold	Ohio Valley	First round	DePaul	L 99–52
Mideast	Michigan	Dave Strack	Big Ten	Runner Up	UCLA	L 91–80
Mideast	Ohio	James Snyder	Mid-American	First round	Dayton	L 66–65
Mideast	Vanderbilt	Roy Skinner	Southeastern	Regional Runner-up	Michigan	L 87–85
Midwest
Midwest	Houston	Guy Lewis	Independent	Regional Fourth Place	SMU	L 89–87
Midwest	Notre Dame	John Dee	Independent	First round	Houston	L 99–98
Midwest	Oklahoma State	Henry Iba	Big Eight	Regional Runner-up	Wichita State	L 54–46
Midwest	SMU	Doc Hayes	Southwest	Regional third place	Houston	W 89–87
Midwest	Wichita State	Gary Thompson	Missouri Valley	Fourth Place	Princeton	L 118–82
West
West	BYU	Stan Watts	Western Athletic	Regional Fourth Place	Oklahoma City	L 112–102
West	Colorado State	Jim Williams	Independent	First round	Oklahoma City	L 70–68
West	Oklahoma City	Abe Lemons	Independent	Regional third place	BYU	W 112–102
West	San Francisco	Pete Peletta	West Coast Athletic	Regional Runner-up	UCLA	L 101–93
West	UCLA	John Wooden	AAWU	Champion	Michigan	W 91–80

== Bracket ==
* – Denotes overtime period

=== East region ===
Quarterfinals
Princeton	60
Penn State	58
Saint Joseph's	67
Connecticut	61
Providence	91
West Virginia	67

Semifinals
NC State	48
Princeton	66
Saint Joseph's	73*
Providence	81

Finals
Princeton	109
Providence	69

=== Mideast region ===
Quarterfinals
Dayton	66
Ohio	65
DePaul	99
Eastern Kentucky	52

Semifinals
Michigan	98
Dayton	71
Vanderbilt	83
DePaul	78*

Finals
Michigan	87
Vanderbilt	85

=== Midwest region ===
Quarterfinals
Houston	99
Notre Dame	98

Semifinals
Wichita State	86
SMU	81
Oklahoma State	75
Houston	60

Finals
Wichita State	54
Oklahoma State	46

=== West region ===
Quarterfinals
Oklahoma City	70
Colorado State	68

Semifinals
UCLA	100
BYU	76
San Francisco	91
Oklahoma City	67

Finals
UCLA	101
San Francisco	93

=== Final Four ===
National Semifinals
E	Princeton	76
ME	Michigan	93
MW	Wichita State	89
W	UCLA	108

National Championship Game
ME	Michigan	80
W	UCLA	91

=== National Third Place Game ===
National Third Place Game
E	Princeton	118
MW	Wichita State	82

=== Regional third place games ===
East Regional third place
NC State	103
Saint Joseph's	81

Mideast Regional third place
Dayton	75
DePaul	69

Midwest Regional third place
SMU	89
Houston	87

West Regional third place
Oklahoma City	112
BYU	102

== See also ==
- 1965 NCAA College Division basketball tournament
- 1965 National Invitation Tournament
- 1965 NAIA basketball tournament
- 1964–65 UCLA Bruins men's basketball team
