= 1964–65 Western Kentucky State Hilltoppers basketball team =

American college basketball season

1964–65 Western Kentucky State Hilltoppers basketball

NIT Tournament, Quarterfinal
- Conference: Ohio Valley Conference
- Record: 18–9 (10–4 OVC)
- Head coach: John Oldham
- Assistant coach: Gene Rhodes
- Home arena: E. A. Diddle Arena

The 1964–65 Western Kentucky State Hilltoppers men's basketball team represented Western Kentucky State College (now known as Western Kentucky University) during the 1964-65 NCAA University Division Basketball season. The Hilltoppers were led by first year coach John Oldham and Ohio Valley Conference Player of the Year Clem Haskins. After two losing seasons, WKSC finished second in the OVC and were invited to the 1965 National Invitation Tournament.

Haskins scored a school record 55 points against Middle Tennessee on January 30. He was joined on the all-conference team by fellow sophomore Dwight Smith; Haskins and Steve Cunningham were selected to the OVC Tournament team.

== Cultural Relevance ==
Haskins and Smith broke the color barrier this season at Western Kentucky, becoming the first African Americans to play Hilltopper basketball. They were recruited two years earlier by the previous, longtime coach Edgar Diddle; NCAA rules at the time prohibited freshman from playing varsity sports, so this was their first year of eligibility.

== Schedule ==
Date time, TV	Opponent	Result	Record	Site city, state
Regular Season
12/1/1964*	Belmont	L 50–52	0–1	E. A. Diddle Arena; Bowling Green, KY
12/5/1964*	at Bowling Green	W 90–77	1–1	Anderson Arena; Bowling Green, OH
12/8/1964*	at Vanderbilt	L 79–94	1–2	Memorial Gymnasium; Nashville, TN
12/12/1964*	Chattanooga	W 94–78	2–2	E. A. Diddle Arena; Bowling Green, KY
12/15/1964*	Carson–Newman	W 73–54	3–2	E. A. Diddle Arena; Bowling Green, KY
12/17/1964*	Texas Wesleyan	W 118–87	4–2	E. A. Diddle Arena; Bowling Green, KY
12/21/1964	vs. Middle Tennessee; OVC Tournament	W 100–65	5–2	Convention Center; Louisville, KY
12/22/1964	vs. Eastern Kentucky; OVC Tournament Semifinal	W 82–73	6–2	Convention Center; Louisville, KY
12/23/1964	vs. Murray State; OVC Tournament Final	L 68–77	6–3	Convention Center; Louisville, KY
1/5/1965	Murray State	W 71–70 ^{OT}	7–3 (1-0)	E. A. Diddle Arena; Bowling Green, KY
1/9/1965	at Tennessee Tech	W 87–78	8–3 (2-0)	Memorial Gymnasium; Cookeville, TN
1/11/1965	at East Tennessee	W 70–69	9–3 (3-0)	Brooks Gymnasium; Johnson City, TN
1/16/1965	Eastern Kentucky	L 70–95	9–4 (3-1)	E. A. Diddle Arena; Bowling Green, KY
1/18/1965	Morehead State	W 93–65	10–4 (4-1)	E. A. Diddle Arena; Bowling Green, KY
1/23/1965*	Union (TN)	W 94–69	11–4	E. A. Diddle Arena; Bowling Green, KY
1/30/1965	Middle Tennessee; Haskins scores 55 points	W 134–84	12–4 (5-1)	E. A. Diddle Arena; Bowling Green, KY
2/1/1965	at Austin Peay	W 78–74	13–4 (6-1)	Memorial Health Gymnasium; Clarksville, TN
2/6/1965	East Tennessee	W 96–79	14–4 (7-1)	E. A. Diddle Arena; Bowling Green, KY
2/8/1965	Tennessee Tech	W 92–83	15–4 (8-1)	E. A. Diddle Arena; Bowling Green, KY
2/13/1965	at Morehead State	L 55–66	15–5 (8-2)	Wetherby Gymnasium; Morehead, KY
2/18/1965	at Eastern Kentucky	L 69–80	15–6 (8-3)	Alumni Coliseum; Richmond, KY
2/18/1965	at Middle Tennessee	W 94–83	16–6 (9-3)	Alumni Memorial Gym; Murfreesboro, TN
2/20/1965*	at La Salle	L 77–91	16–7	Palestra; Philadelphia, PA
2/22/1965	Austin Peay	W 116–77	17–7 (10-3)	E. A. Diddle Arena; Bowling Green, KY
2/27/1965	at Murray State	L 91–103	17–8 (10-4)	Racer Arena; Murray, KY
1965 National Invitation Tournament
3/13/1965*	vs. Fordham; NIT First Round	W 57–53	18–8	Madison Square Garden; New York, NY
3/16/1965*	vs. Army; NIT Quarterfinal	L 54–58	18–9	Madison Square Garden; New York, NY
*Non-conference game. ^{#}Rankings from AP Poll. (#) Tournament seedings in parentheses.
