= Bobby Lewis (basketball, born 1946) =

American basketball player (1946–2024)

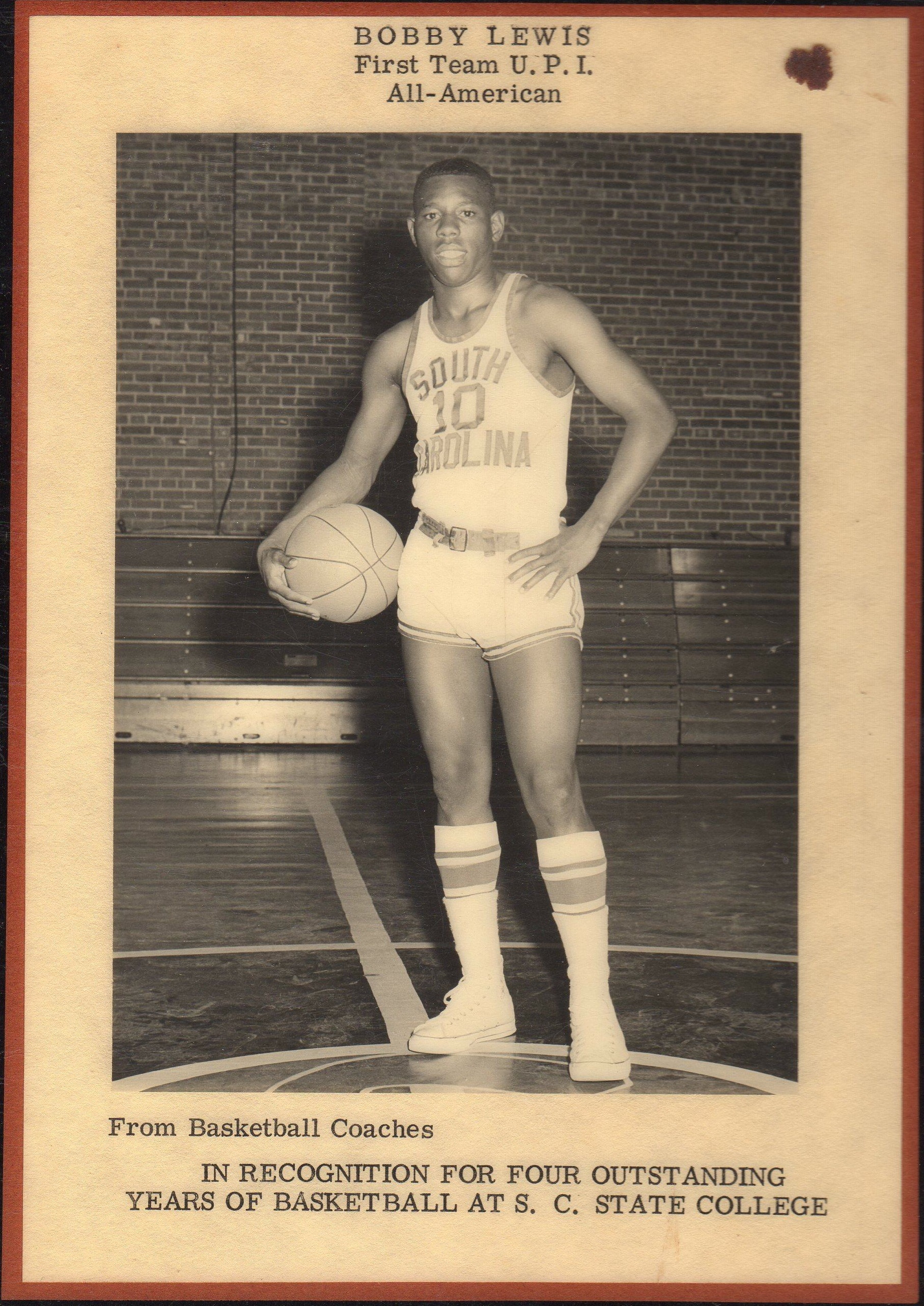
- Lewis, South Carolina State Bulldogs 1964–1968

Personal information
- Born: July 25, 1946 Philadelphia, Pennsylvania, U.S.
- Died: September 19, 2024 (aged 78)
- Listed height: 5 ft 10 in (1.78 m)
- Listed weight: 165 lb (75 kg)

Career information
- High school: John Bartram (Philadelphia, Pennsylvania)
- College: South Carolina State (1964–1968)
- ABA draft: 1968: 5th round, 2nd overall pick
- Drafted by: Dallas Chaparrals
- Playing career: 1968–1974
- Position: Guard
- Number: 10
- Coaching career: 1978–1981

Career history

Playing
- 1968–1969: Gillette Corporation/USA All Stars
- 1969–1974: Wilmington Blue Bombers

Coaching
- 1978–1981: Haverford College (assistant)

Career highlights
- 3× All-SIAC (1966–1968); SIAC Tournament MVP (1967); First-team Small College All-American – UPI (1967)
- Stats at Basketball Reference
Medals
Representing United States
Basketball
1967 FIBA Small Player's World Cup Games
Gold medal – first place	Barcelona	United States

Robert F. Lewis (July 25, 1946 – September 19, 2024) was an American college and pro basketball player known for his flamboyant dribbling, passing, and play-making. Born in Philadelphia, Pennsylvania, Lewis was a playground and YMCA legend from an early age. His legend grew while at John Bartram High School where he was able to showcase the many moves he adapted from his Hall of Fame mentor, Guy Rodgers. Lewis died September 19, 2024, at the age of 78.

== Early years ==
Before focusing on basketball, Lewis excelled at table tennis and baseball. In 1960 he was invited to the Youth Table Tennis National Championships in New York, NY after becoming the City of Philadelphia champion. Lewis along with three other youth sports standouts were participants in the TastyKake Baking Company's "Salute to Youth" Campaign that same year. In 1963 he was a member of the City Championship Baseball team along with Major League Baseball Scout Hall of Famer Al Goldis. The following year, he was selected for the 1st Team All City Basketball Team and was also selected as an Eastern Region High School Basketball All American along with Hall of Famer Lew Alcindor.

== College ==
Lewis rose to prominence at a national level while playing basketball at then Division II South Carolina State College, located in Orangeburg, South Carolina. Under hall of fame coach Ed Martin, Lewis averaged 12 points his freshman year, 11.9 points as a sophomore and 19.1 points as a junior. In 1967, his second year as the team captain, Lewis led his team to the NCAA DII Regional Finals. That same year he was selected as team captain and flag bearer for the United States team in the FIBA Small Player's World Cup Games. The team won the gold medal and was coached by Hall of Famer, John McClendon.

Lewis came back the next year to record an amazing 30.9 points and 11.8 assists per game in his senior year. He was the #8 leading scorer in the NCAA which earned him UPI Small Colleges 1st Team All American honors.

== "THE" 2 Ball Drill Originator ==
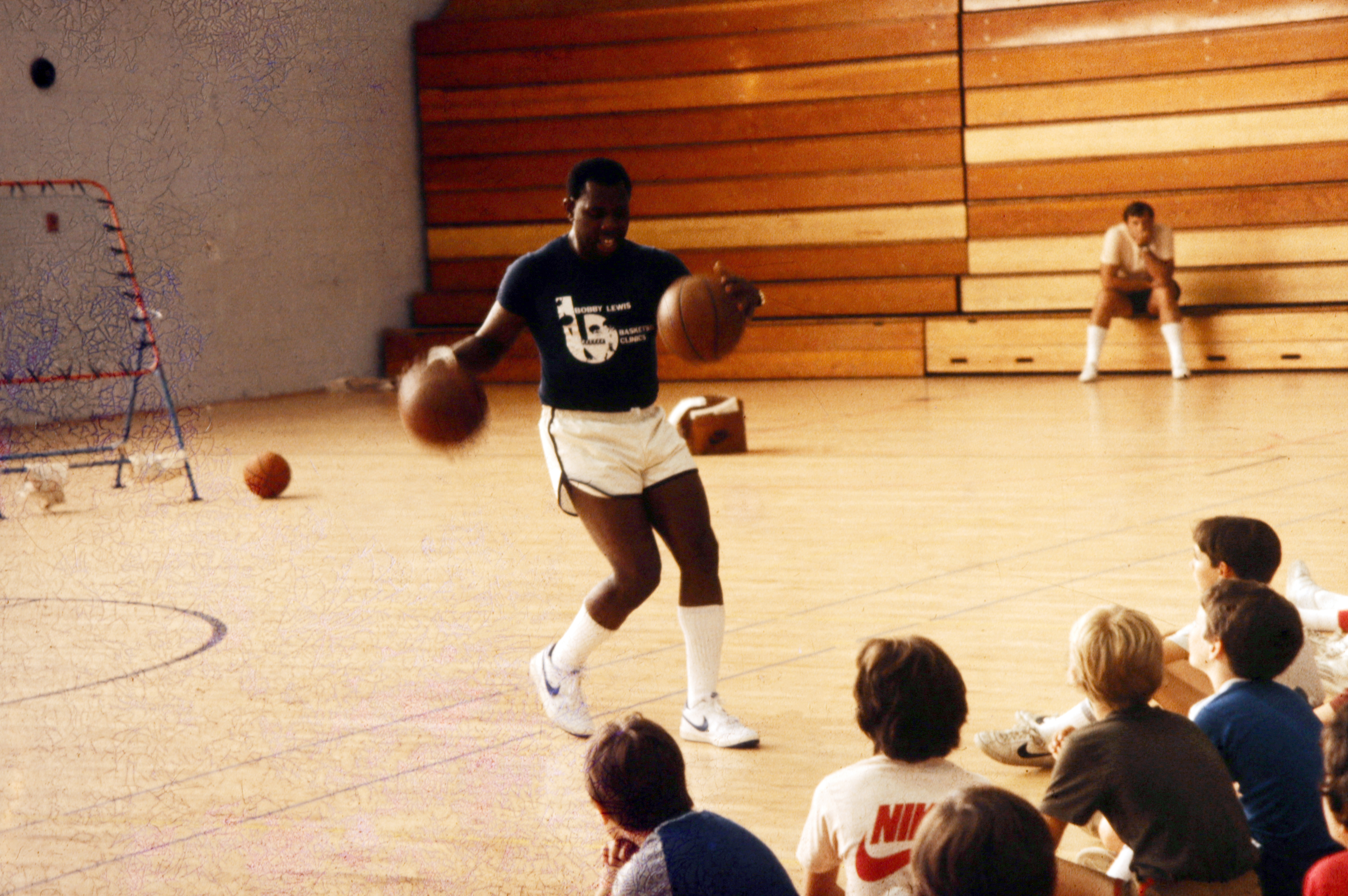
Side Drill

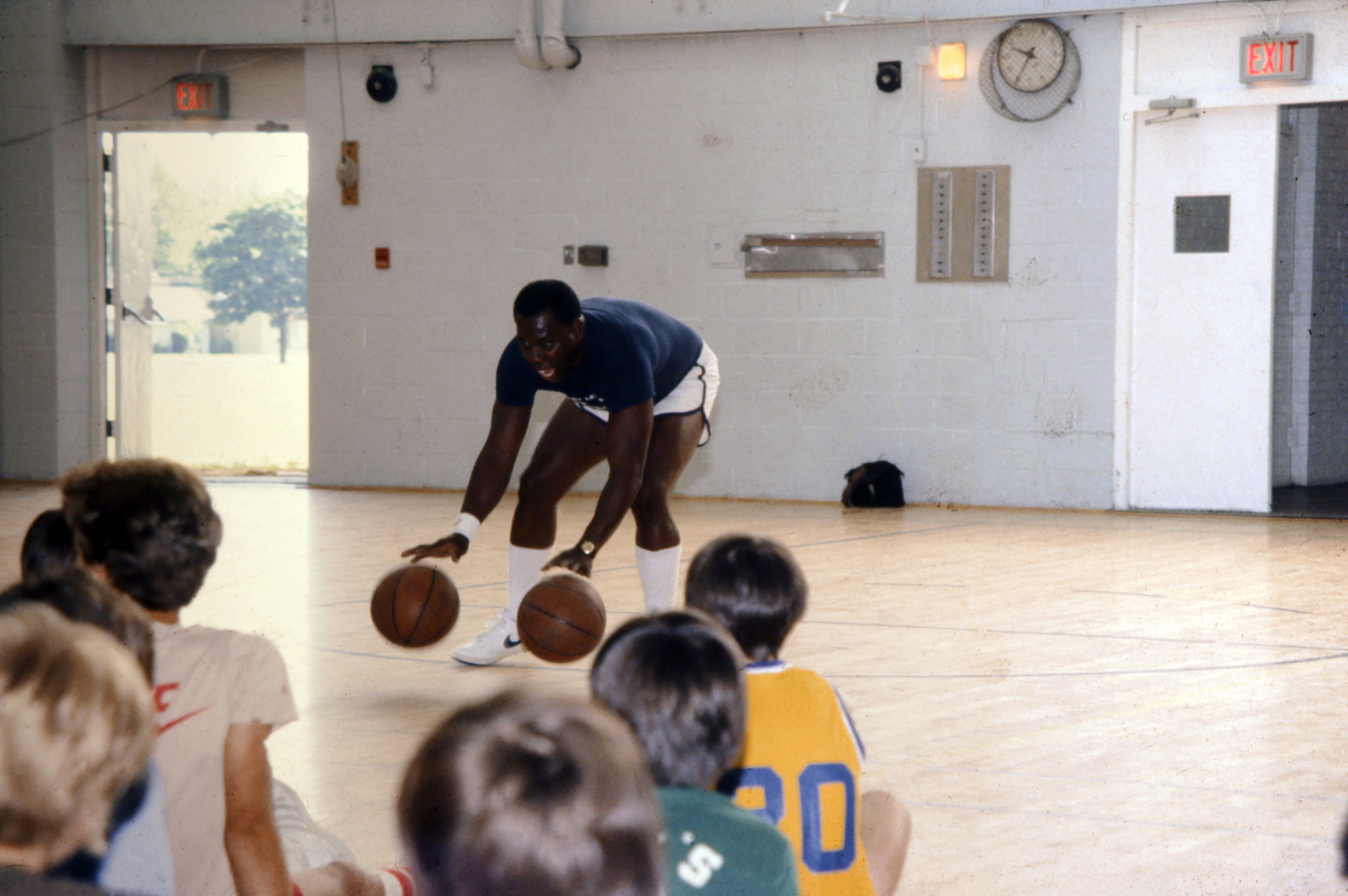
Low Ball Drill

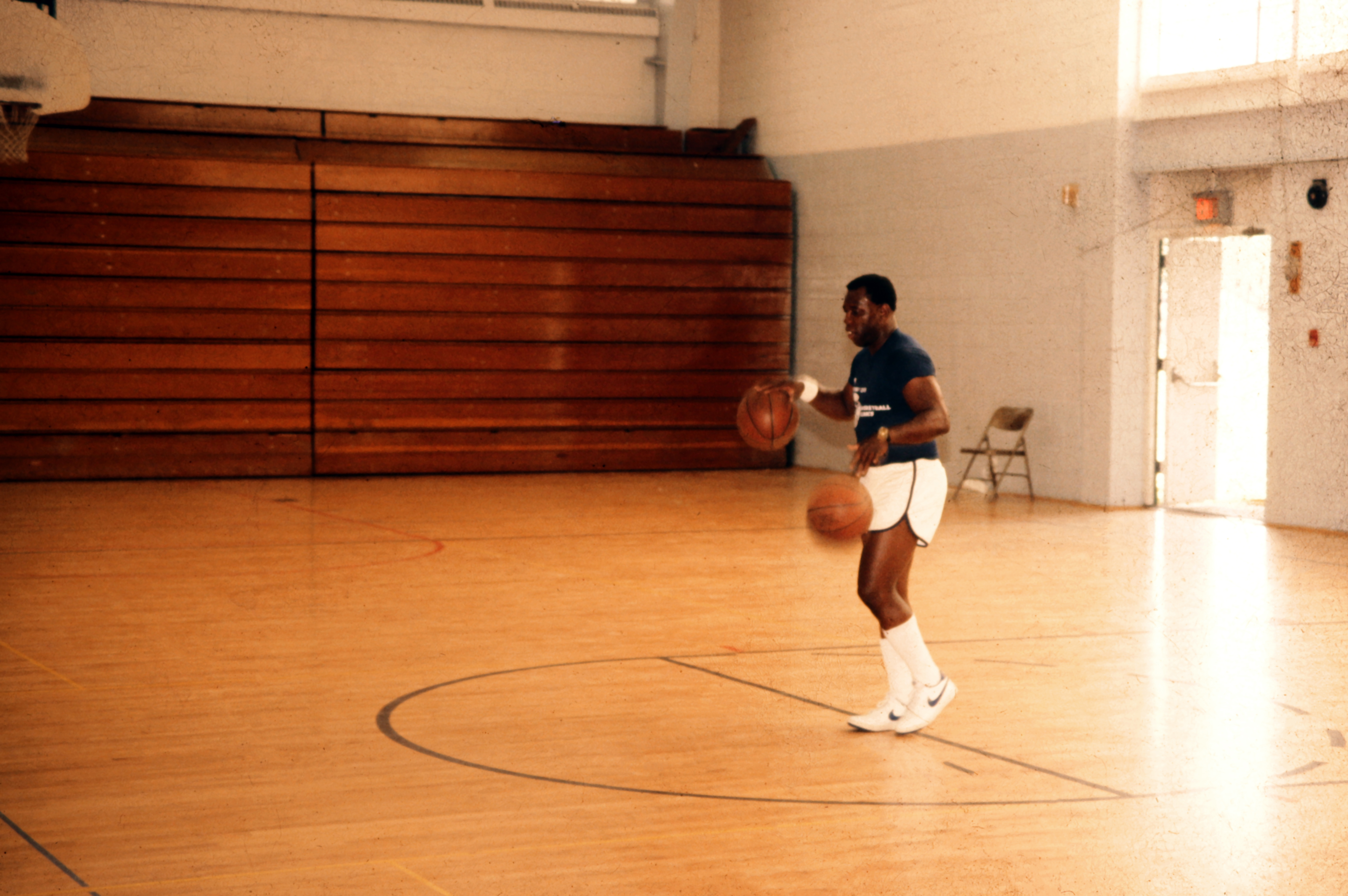
High Low Ball Drill

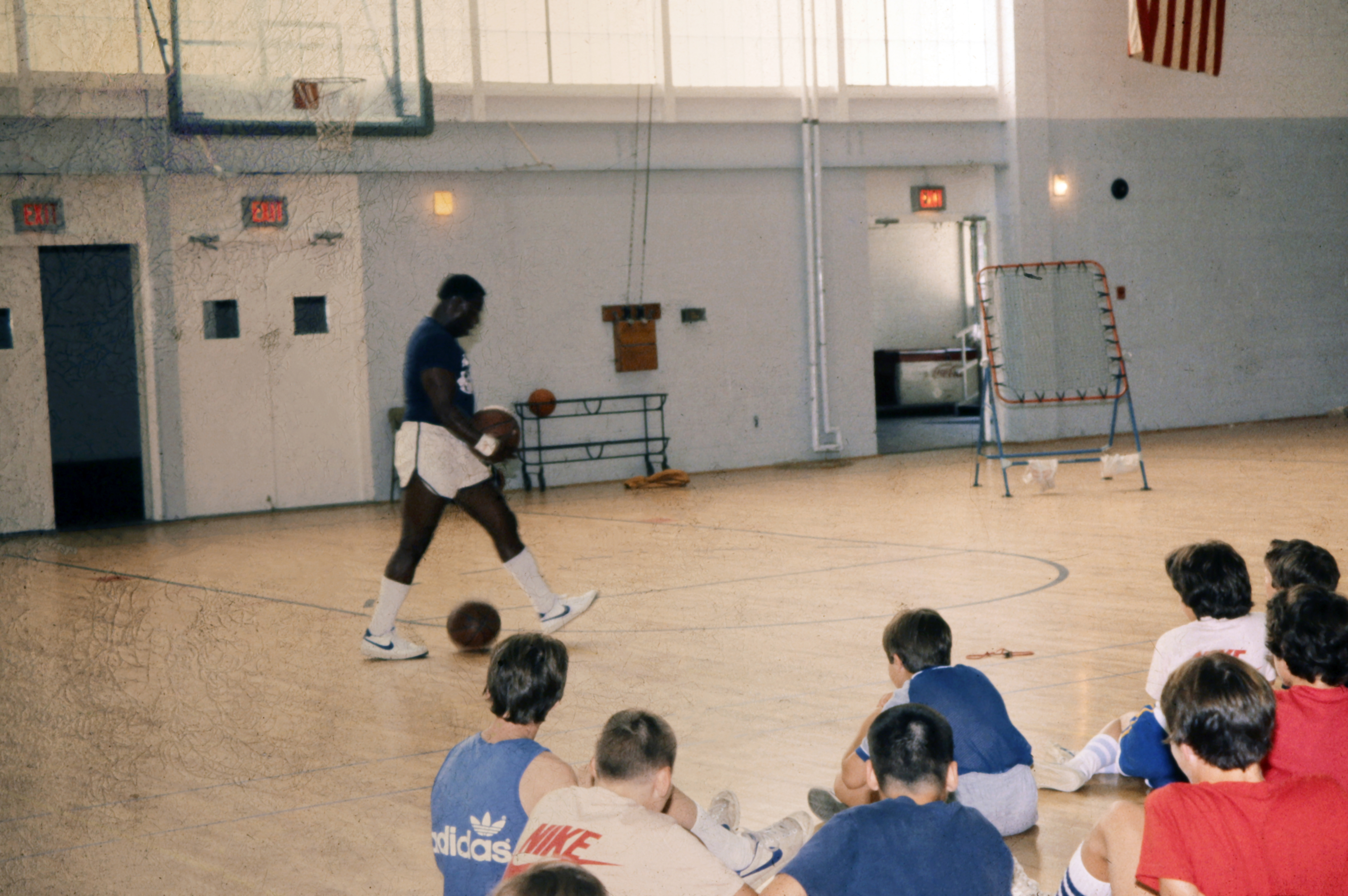
Between Legs Drill
