= 1965 NCAA College Division basketball tournament =

Edition of USA college basketball tournament

- Teams: 32
- Finals site: Roberts Municipal Stadium, Evansville, Indiana
- Champions: Evansville Purple Aces (4th title)
- Runner-up: Southern Illinois Salukis (1st title game)
- Semifinalists: North Dakota Fighting Sioux (1st Final Four); St. Michael's Purple Knights (2nd Final Four)
- Winning coach: Arad McCutchan (4th title)
- MOP: Jerry Sloan (Evansville)
- Attendance: 36,084

The 1965 NCAA College Division basketball tournament involved 32 schools playing in a single-elimination tournament to determine the national champion of men's NCAA College Division college basketball as a culmination of the 1964–65 NCAA College Division men's basketball season. It was won by the University of Evansville, with Evansville's Jerry Sloan named the Most Outstanding Player for the second consecutive year.

1965 NCAA Division II Men's sites - regionals (cyan) Elite Eight (red)

== Regional participants ==
School	Outcome
Akron	Regional Champion
Buffalo	Runner-up
Randolph–Macon	Fourth Place
Steubenville	Third Place

School	Outcome
Assumption	Runner-up
Hartwick	Third Place
Le Moyne	Fourth Place
St. Michael's	Regional Champion

School	Outcome
Bellarmine	Runner-up
Bethune–Cookman	Fourth Place
Evansville	Regional Champion
Norfolk State	Third Place

School	Outcome
Albright	Fourth Place
Cheyney	Third Place
Long Island	Runner-up
Philadelphia Textile	Regional Champion

School	Outcome
Colorado State College	Fourth Place
Minnesota–Duluth	Third Place
Moorhead State	Runner-up
North Dakota	Regional Champion

School	Outcome
Fresno State	Runner-up
Nevada Southern	Fourth Place
San Francisco State	Third Place
Seattle Pacific	Regional Champion

School	Outcome
Central Michigan	Runner-up
Concordia (IL)	Fourth Place
Jackson State	Third Place
Southern Illinois	Regional Champion

School	Outcome
Abilene Christian	Runner-up
Central Missouri State	Third Place
Doane	Fourth Place
Washington (MO)	Regional Champion

== Regionals ==
=== Mideast - Akron, Ohio ===
Location: Memorial Hall Host: Municipal University of Akron

Regional semifinals Round of 32; March 5
Buffalo	81
Randolph–Macon	69
Akron	72
Steubenville	70

Regional final Sweet 16; March 6
Buffalo	58
Akron	69

- Third Place - Steubenville 94, Randolph–Macon 68

=== Northeast - DeWitt, New York ===
Location: Le Moyne Athletic Center Host: Le Moyne College

Regional semifinals Round of 32; March 5
St. Michael's	77
Hartwick	72
Assumption	76
Le Moyne	58

Regional final Sweet 16; March 6
St. Michael's	83
Assumption	76

- Third Place - Hartwick 70, Le Moyne 68

=== South Central - Louisville, Kentucky ===
Location: Knights Hall Host: Bellarmine College

Regional semifinals Round of 32; March 5
Evansville	116
Bethune–Cookman	77
Bellarmine	91
Norfolk State	74

Regional final Sweet 16; March 6
Evansville	81
Bellarmine	74

- Third Place - Norfolk State 91, Bethune–Cookman 74

=== East - Reading, Pennsylvania ===
Location: Bollman Center Host: Albright College

Regional semifinals Round of 32; March 5
Long Island	57
Cheyney	48
Philadelphia Textile	50
Albright	49

Regional final Sweet 16; March 6
Long Island	58
Philadelphia Textile	61

- Third Place - Cheyney 52, Albright 51

=== Midwest - Grand Forks, North Dakota ===
Location: Hyslop Sports Center Host: University of North Dakota

Regional semifinals Round of 32; March 5
Moorhead State	74
Colorado State College	73
North Dakota	67
Minnesota–Duluth	57

Regional final Sweet 16; March 6
Moorhead State	57
North Dakota	82

- Third Place - Minnesota–Duluth 86, Colorado State College 58

=== Pacific Coast - Seattle, Washington ===
Location: Royal Brougham Pavilion Host: Seattle Pacific University

Regional semifinals Round of 32; March 5
Fresno State	74
Nevada Southern	61
Seattle Pacific	107
San Francisco State	78

Regional final Sweet 16; March 6
Fresno State	68
Seattle Pacific	82

- Third Place - San Francisco State 85, Nevada Southern 78

=== Great Lakes - Carbondale, Illinois ===
Location: SIU Arena Host: Southern Illinois University

Regional semifinals Round of 32; March 5
Central Michigan	83
Jackson State	79
Southern Illinois	71
Concordia (IL)	70

Regional final Sweet 16; March 6
Central Michigan	62
Southern Illinois	90

- Third Place - Jackson State 90, Concordia 80

=== Southwest - Warrensburg, Missouri ===
Location: CMSU Fieldhouse Host: Central Missouri State University

Regional semifinals Round of 32; March 5
Abilene Christian	91
Doane	50
Washington (MO)	82
Central Missouri State	67

Regional final Sweet 16; March 6
Abilene Christian	66
Washington (MO)	69

- Third Place - Central Missouri State 105, Doane 52

*denotes each overtime played

== National Finals - Evansville, Indiana ==
Location: Roberts Municipal Stadium Host: Evansville College

National Quarterfinals; Elite Eight; March 10
Akron	87
St. Michael's	101
Evansville	92
Philadelphia Textile	76
North Dakota	97
Seattle Pacific	83
Southern Illinois	76
Washington (MO)	67

National semifinals Final Four; March 11
St. Michael's	70
Evansville	93
North Dakota	64
Southern Illinois	97

National championship March 12
Evansville	85*
Southern Illinois	82

- Third Place - North Dakota 94, St. Michael's 86

*denotes each overtime played

== All-tournament team ==
- Walt Frazier (Southern Illinois)
- Larry Humes (Evansville)
- George McNeil (Southern Illinois)
- Jerry Sloan (Evansville)
- Richard Tarrant (Saint Michael's)

== See also ==
- 1965 NCAA University Division basketball tournament
- 1965 NAIA Basketball Tournament

== Sources ==
- 2010 NCAA Men's Basketball Championship Tournament Records and Statistics: Division II men's basketball Championship
- 1965 NCAA College Division Men's Basketball Tournament jonfmorse.com
