= 1964–65 Wichita State Shockers men's basketball team =

American college basketball season

1964–65 Wichita State Shockers men's basketball

Missouri Valley Conference Champions

NCAA tournament, Final Four
- Conference: Missouri Valley Conference

Ranking
- Coaches: No. 14
- Record: 21–9 (11–3 MVC)
- Head coach: Gary Thompson (1st season)
- Assistant coaches: Verlyn Anderson; Ron Heller
- Home arena: WSU Field House (10,506)

1964–65 Missouri Valley Conference men's basketball standings
	Conf.				Overall
Team	W		L	PCT	W		L	PCT
Wichita State	11	–	3	.786	21	–	9	.700
Bradley	9	–	5	.643	18	–	9	.667
Saint Louis	9	–	5	.643	18	–	9	.667
Louisville	8	–	6	.571	15	–	10	.600
Tulsa	7	–	7	.500	14	–	11	.560
Drake	6	–	8	.429	15	–	10	.600
Cincinnati	5	–	9	.357	14	–	12	.538
North Texas State	1	–	13	.071	7	–	19	.269
Rankings from AP Poll

The 1964–65 Wichita State Shockers men's basketball team represented Wichita State University in the 1964–65 NCAA University Division men's basketball season. They played their home games at the University of Wichita Field House. They were in their 20th season as a member of the Missouri Valley Conference and 59th season overall. They were led by first-year head coach Gary Thompson. The Shockers finished the season 21–9, 11–3 in Missouri Valley play to finish in first place. They received a bid to the 1965 NCAA Tournament and advanced to the first Final Four in school history.

== Roster ==
1964–65 Wichita State Shockers men's basketball team
Players
Coaches

Pos.	#	Name	Height	Weight	Year	Hometown
C	12	Nate Bowman	6 ft 10 in (2.08 m)	225 lb (102 kg)	Sr	Kirkpatrick	Fort Worth, Texas
G	30	Kelly Pete	6 ft 1 in (1.85 m)	—	Jr
F	42	Dave Stallworth	6 ft 7 in (2.01 m)	—	Sr	James Madison	Dallas, Texas

Head coach

- Gary Thompson (Wichita State)

Assistant coach(es)

- Ron Heller
- Verlyn Anderson

Legend

- (C) Team captain
- (S) Suspended
- (I) Ineligible
- (W) Walk-on
- Injured
- Current redshirt

== Schedule and results ==
Date time, TV	Rank^{#}	Opponent^{#}	Result	Record	Site (attendance) city, state
Regular season
Dec 5, 1964*	No. 3	Long Beach State	W 114–78	1–0	WSU Field House; Wichita, Kansas
Dec 9, 1964*	No. 2	UTEP	W 73–55	2–0	WSU Field House; Wichita, Kansas
Dec 11, 1964*	No. 2	BYU	W 93–76	3–0	WSU Field House; Wichita, Kansas
Dec 12, 1964*	No. 2	BYU	W 81–65	4–0	WSU Field House; Wichita, Kansas
Dec 14, 1964*	No. 2	at No. 1 Michigan	L 85–87	4–1	Cobo Arena; Detroit, Michigan
Dec 19, 1964	No. 1	at Drake	W 71–60	5–1 (1–0)	Veterans Memorial Auditorium; Des Moines, Iowa
Dec 26, 1964*	No. 2	vs. Pittsburgh; Quaker City Invitational	W 109–58	6–1	Philadelphia, Pennsylvania
Dec 28, 1964*	No. 2	vs. Villanova; Quaker City Invitational	W 86–74	7–1	Philadelphia, Pennsylvania
Dec 29, 1964*	No. 2	at No. 10 Saint Joseph's; Quaker City Invitational	L 69–76	7–2	Hagan Arena; Philadelphia, Pennsylvania
Jan 2, 1965	No. 2	North Texas	W 107–88	8–2 (2–0)	WSU Field House; Wichita, Kansas
Jan 4, 1965	No. 2	at Bradley	W 85–79	9–2 (3–0)	Robertson Memorial Field House; Peoria, Illinois
Jan 9, 1965	No. 5	at Cincinnati	W 65–61	10–2 (4–0)	Armory Fieldhouse; Cincinnati, Ohio
Jan 11, 1965*	No. 5	Southern Illinois	W 94–81	11–2	WSU Field House; Wichita, Kansas
Jan 16, 1965	No. 3	Saint Louis	W 75–64	12–2 (5–0)	WSU Field House; Wichita, Kansas
Jan 29, 1965*	No. 5	at Loyola-Chicago	L 92–93	12–3	Alumni Gym; Chicago, Illinois
Jan 30, 1965	No. 5	Louisville	W 96–76	13–3 (6–0)	WSU Field House; Wichita, Kansas
Feb 6, 1965	No. 8	at Saint Louis	W 72–64	14–3 (7–0)	Kiel Auditorium; St. Louis, Missouri
Feb 8, 1965*	No. 8	at Duquesne	L 72–75	14–4	Civic Arena; Pittsburgh, Pennsylvania
Feb 13, 1965*	No. 9	Cincinnati	W 79–64	15–4 (8–0)	WSU Field House; Wichita, Kansas
Feb 15, 1965*	No. 9	Loyola-Chicago	W 80–77	16–4	WSU Field House; Wichita, Kansas
Feb 18, 1965	No. 10	at Tulsa	L 64–75	16–5 (8–1)	Expo Square Pavilion; Tulsa, Oklahoma
Feb 20, 1965	No. 10	at North Texas	W 69–67	17–5 (9–1)	North Texas Men's Gym; Denton, Texas
Feb 27, 1965		Bradley	L 73–77	17–6 (9–2)	WSU Field House; Wichita, Kansas
Mar 1, 1965*		Tulsa	W 59–48	18–6 (10–2)	WSU Field House; Wichita, Kansas
Mar 3, 1965		at Louisville	L 70–79	18–7 (10–3)	Freedom Hall; Louisville, Kentucky
Mar 6, 1965		Drake	W 76–74	19–7 (11–3)	WSU Field House; Wichita, Kansas
1965 NCAA Tournament
Mar 12, 1965*		vs. SMU; Midwest Regional semifinal – Sweet Sixteen	W 86–81	20–7	Ahearn Field House; Manhattan, Kansas
Mar 13, 1965*		vs. Oklahoma State; Midwest Regional final – Elite Eight	W 54–46	21–7	Ahearn Field House; Manhattan, Kansas
Mar 19, 1965*		vs. No. 2 UCLA; National semifinal – Final Four	L 89–108	21–8	Memorial Coliseum; Portland, Oregon
Mar 20, 1965*		vs. Princeton; National 3rd-place game	L 82–118	21–9	Memorial Coliseum; Portland, Oregon
*Non-conference game. ^{#}Rankings from AP Poll. (#) Tournament seedings in parentheses. MW=Midwest. All times are in Central Time.

== Rankings ==
Ranking movements Legend: ██ Increase in ranking ██ Decrease in ranking — = Not ranked
	Week														
Poll	Pre	1	2	3	4	5	6	7	8	9	10	11	12	13	Final
AP	3	2	1	2	2	5	3	4	5	8	9	10	—	—	—
Coaches	4	3	1	2	2	3	3	3	3	5	8	7	10	13	14

== Awards and honors ==
- Dave Stallworth – Consensus Second-team All-American

== NBA draft ==
Round	Pick	Player	NBA Club
1	3	Dave Stallworth	New York Knicks
1	7	Nate Bowman	Cincinnati Royals
