= Beihang University Gymnasium =

Building in Beijing, China

Coordinates: 39°58′45″N 116°20′35″E

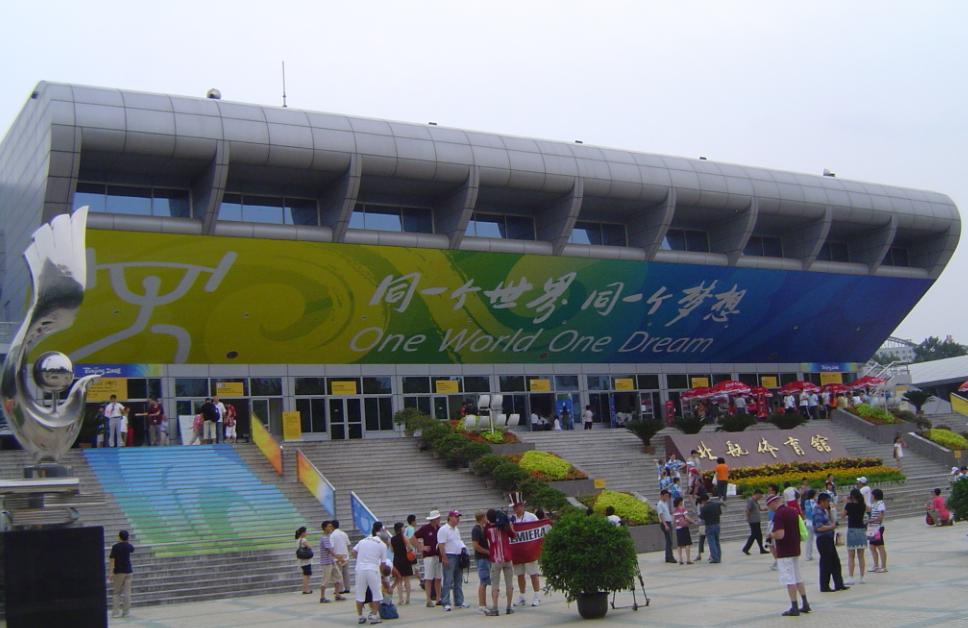
- The indoor arena at the 2008 Summer Olympics.
- Interactive map of Beihang University Gymnasium
- Location: Beihang University
- Owner: Beihang University
- Capacity: 5,400

Construction
- Opened: 2001

Tenant
- Beihang University

Beihang University Gymnasium (simplified Chinese: 北京航空航天大学体育馆; traditional Chinese: 北京航空航天大學體育館; pinyin: Běijīng Hángkōng Hángtiān Dàxué Tǐyùguǎn, sometime listed as the Beijing University of Aeronautics & Astronautics Gymnasium) is a 5,400-seat indoor arena located on the campus of Beihang University in Beijing, China. It hosted weightlifting competitions at the 2008 Summer Olympics and powerlifting competitions at the 2008 Summer Paralympics.
