= 1964–65 Connecticut Huskies men's basketball team =

American college basketball season

1964–65 Connecticut Huskies men's basketball

Yankee Conference Regular Season Champions

NCAA University Division Tournament, First Round
- Conference: Yankee Conference

Ranking
- Coaches: No. 15
- Record: 23–3 (10–0 YC)
- Head coach: Fred Shabel (2nd season)
- Assistant coach: Burr Carlson
- Home arena: Hugh S. Greer Field House

1964–65 Yankee Conference men's basketball standings
	Conf.				Overall
Team	W		L	PCT	W		L	PCT
Connecticut	10	–	0	1.000	23	–	3	.885
Massachusetts	8	–	2	.800	13	–	11	.542
Rhode Island	6	–	4	.600	15	–	11	.577
Maine	4	–	6	.400	13	–	10	.565
Vermont	1	–	9	.100	7	–	13	.350
New Hampshire	1	–	9	.100	2	–	19	.095

The 1964–65 Connecticut Huskies men's basketball team represented the University of Connecticut in the 1964–65 collegiate men's basketball season. The Huskies completed the season with a 23–3 overall record. The Huskies were members of the Yankee Conference, where they ended the season with a 10–0 record. They were the Yankee Conference Regular Season Champions and made it to the First Round in the 1965 NCAA Division I men's basketball tournament. The Huskies played their home games at Hugh S. Greer Field House in Storrs, Connecticut, and were led by second-year head coach Fred Shabel.

== Schedule ==
Date time, TV	Rank^{#}	Opponent^{#}	Result	Record	Site (attendance) city, state
Regular Season
12/1/1964*		American International	W 98–67	1–0	Hugh S. Greer Field House; Storrs, CT
12/5/1964*		at Yale	W 68–47	2–0	Payne Whitney Gymnasium; New Haven, CT
12/9/1964*		Harvard	W 78–30	3–0	Hugh S. Greer Field House; Storrs, CT
12/12/1964*		at Boston College	W 85–81 ^{OT}	4–0	Roberts Center; Boston, MA
12/15/1964		Massachusetts	W 77–67	5–0 (1–0)	Hugh S. Greer Field House; Storrs, CT
12/17/1964		at Maine	W 89–62	6–0 (2–0)	Memorial Gymnasium; Orono, ME
12/19/1964*		Fordham	W 59–51	7–0	Hugh S. Greer Field House; Storrs, CT
12/31/1964*		vs. Cornell; Queen City Tournament	W 75–63	8–0	Buffalo Memorial Auditorium; Buffalo, NY
1/2/1965*		vs. Virginia; Queen City Tournament	L 63–68	8–1	Buffalo Memorial Auditorium; Buffalo, NY
1/5/1965*		Holy Cross	L 62–77	8–2	Hugh S. Greer Field House; Storrs, CT
1/9/1965		Vermont	W 111–66	9–2 (3–0)	Hugh S. Greer Field House; Storrs, CT
1/12/1965		at New Hampshire	W 82–62	10–2 (4–0)	Lundholm Gym; Durham, NH
1/16/1965		Rhode Island	W 78–68	11–2 (5–0)	Hugh S. Greer Field House; Storrs, CT
1/27/1965*		Temple	W 71–61	12–2	Hugh S. Greer Field House; Storrs, CT
1/30/1965		at Vermont	W 107–60	13–2 (6–0)	Patrick Gym; Burlington, VT
2/3/1965*		Rutgers	W 103–73	14–2	Hugh S. Greer Field House; Storrs, CT
2/6/1965		Maine	W 95–59	15–2 (7–0)	Hugh S. Greer Field House; Storrs, CT
2/9/1965		at Massachusetts	W 70–63	16–2 (8–0)	Curry Hicks Cage; Amherst, MA
2/13/1965*		at Holy Cross	W 87–76	17–2	Worcester, MA
2/16/1965*		Boston University	W 87–86	18–2	Hugh S. Greer Field House; Storrs, CT
2/20/1965*		American	W 115–60	19–2	Hugh S. Greer Field House; Storrs, CT
2/24/1965*		at Manhattan	W 80–75 ^{OT}	20–2	New York, NY
2/27/1965		New Hampshire	W 109–61	21–2 (9–0)	Hugh S. Greer Field House; Storrs, CT
3/3/1965*		at Colgate	W 101–66	22–2	Cotterell Court; Hamilton, NY
3/6/1965		at Rhode Island	W 88–73	23–2 (10–0)	Keaney Gymnasium; Kingston, RI
NCAA Tournament
3/8/1965*		vs. St. Joseph's; First Round	L 61–67	23–3	Philadelphia, PA
*Non-conference game. ^{#}Rankings from AP Poll. (#) Tournament seedings in parentheses. All times are in Eastern Time.

Schedule Source:
