= Ken Rosemond =

American basketball player and coach

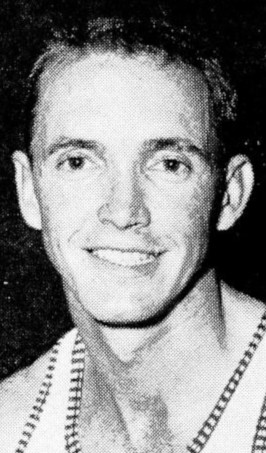
- Rosemond, circa 1956

Biographical details
- Born: October 3, 1930
- Died: April 10, 1993 (aged 62); Durham, North Carolina, U.S.

Playing career
- 1955–1957: North Carolina
- Position: Guard

Coaching career (HC unless noted)
- 1960–1965: North Carolina (assistant)
- 1965–1973: Georgia

Head coaching record
- Overall: 92–111

Kenneth W. Rosemond (October 30, 1930 – April 10, 1993) was an American college basketball coach. Rosemond played college basketball at the University of North Carolina under future Hall of Fame coach Frank McGuire and was a member of the school's first national championship team, the undefeated 1956–57 Tar Heel squad.

Following his college career, Rosemond became a coach. He was Dean Smith's first assistant coach, serving on Smith's staff from 1961 until 1965. He was then named head coach at the University of Georgia, where he coached for seven seasons, from 1965 until he was dismissed in 1973, compiling a record of 92–111 (.453).

Rosemond died on April 10, 1993.
