= 1964–65 Atlantic Coast Conference men's basketball season =

== Final standings ==
Rank	School	W	L	Win %
1	Duke	11	3	.786
2	NC State	10	4	.714
3	Maryland	10	4	.714
4	North Carolina	10	4	.714
5	Wake Forest	6	8	.429
6	Clemson	4	10	.286
7	Virginia	3	11	.214
8	South Carolina	2	12	.143

== ACC tournament ==
See 1965 ACC men's basketball tournament

== NCAA tournament ==
=== Regional semifinal ===
Princeton 66, NC State 48

=== Regional third-place game ===
NC State 103, Saint Joseph's 81

=== ACC's NCAA record ===
1–1

== NIT ==
League rules prevented ACC teams from playing in the NIT, 1954–1966
