= 1965–66 UCLA Bruins men's basketball team =

American college basketball season

1965–66 UCLA Bruins men's basketball

L.A. Classic champions
- Conference: Athletic Association of Western Universities
- Record: 18–8 (10–4 AAWU)
- Head coach: John R. Wooden (18th season)
- Assistant coach: Jerry Norman
- Home arena: Pauley Pavilion; Los Angeles, California

1965–66 AAWU Conference men's basketball standings
	Conf.				Overall
Team	W		L	PCT	W		L	PCT
Oregon State	12	–	2	.857	21	–	7	.750
UCLA	10	–	4	.714	18	–	8	.692
Stanford	8	–	6	.571	13	–	12	.520
Washington State	6	–	8	.429	15	–	11	.577
Oregon	6	–	8	.429	13	–	13	.500
USC	6	–	8	.429	13	–	13	.500
Washington	4	–	10	.286	10	–	15	.400
California	4	–	10	.286	9	–	16	.360
Rankings from AP Poll

The 1965–66 UCLA Bruins men's basketball team finished the season in second place, under head coach John R. Wooden. It won the Los Angeles Classic Championship and completed the year with an 18–8 overall record.

== Preseason ==
The 1965–1966 UCLA Bruin team was the ranked No. 1 in preseason polls. On November 27, 1965, the freshmen team, led by Lew Alcindor (later known as Kareem Abdul-Jabbar), defeated the varsity team 75–60 in the newly opened Pauley Pavilion. Alcindor scored 31 points and had 21 rebounds in that game although the defeat had no effect on the varsity's national ranking. The Bruins were still number one the following week.

The game was not played in the ‘women’s gym’. It was actually the first game played at Pauley Pavilion.

== Roster ==
1965–66 UCLA Bruins men's basketball team
Players
Coaches

Pos.	#	Name	Height	Weight	Year	Hometown
G	43	Brice Chambers	6 ft 2 in (1.88 m)	—
F	55	Joe Chrisman	6 ft 3 in (1.91 m)	—
G	40	Freddie Goss	6 ft 1 in (1.85 m)	—	Sr
C	34	Vaughn Hoffman	6 ft 7 in (2.01 m)	—
F	52	Randy Judd	6 ft 4 in (1.93 m)	—
F	54	Edgar Lacey	6 ft 6 in (1.98 m)	—	Jr	Los Angeles, California
F	35	Mike Lynn	6 ft 7 in (2.01 m)	—	Jr	Covina, California
C	32	Doug McIntosh	6 ft 7 in (2.01 m)	—	Sr	Lily, Kentucky
G	25	Don Saffer	6 ft 1 in (1.85 m)	—
C	30	Neville Saner	6 ft 6 in (1.98 m)	—
G	24	Gene Sutherland	6 ft 1 in (1.85 m)	—
G	23	Michael Warren	5 ft 11 in (1.8 m)	—	So	South Bend, Indiana
F	44	Kenny Washington	6 ft 3 in (1.91 m)	—	Sr	Beaufort, South Carolina

Head coach

John Wooden (Purdue)

Assistant coach(es)

- Jerry Norman

Legend

- (C) Team captain
- (S) Suspended
- (I) Ineligible
- (W) Walk-on
- Injured
- Current redshirt

Roster

== Schedule ==
Date time, TV	Rank^{#}	Opponent^{#}	Result	Record	Site city, state
Regular Season
December 3, 1965*	No. 1	Ohio State	W 92–66	1–0	Pauley Pavilion; Los Angeles, CA
December 4, 1965*	No. 1	Illinois	W 97–79	2–0	Pauley Pavilion; Los Angeles, CA
December 10, 1965*	No. 1	at No. 6 Duke	L 66–82	2–1	Cameron Indoor Stadium; Durham, NC
December 11, 1965*	No. 1	vs. No. 6 Duke	L 75–94	2–2	Charlotte Coliseum; Charlotte, NC
December 17, 1965*	No. 8	No. 4 Kansas	W 78–71	3–2	Pauley Pavilion; Los Angeles, CA
December 18, 1965*	No. 8	vs. Cincinnati	L 76–82	3–3	Los Angeles Memorial Sports Arena; Los Angeles, CA
December 21, 1965*		at USC	W 86–67	4–3	Los Angeles Memorial Sports Arena; Los Angeles, CA
December 27, 1965*		vs. LSU; L.A. Classic	W 95–89	5–3	Los Angeles Memorial Sports Arena; Los Angeles, CA
December 29, 1965*		vs. Purdue; L.A. Classic	W 82–70	6–3	Los Angeles Memorial Sports Arena; Los Angeles, CA
December 30, 1965*		at USC; L.A. Classic	W 94–76	7–3	Los Angeles Memorial Sports Arena; Los Angeles, CA
January 7, 1966	No. 10	Oregon State	W 79–35	8–3 (1–0)	Pauley Pavilion; Los Angeles, CA
January 8, 1966	No. 10	Oregon	W 97–65	9–3 (2–0)	Pauley Pavilion; Los Angeles, CA
January 14, 1966	No. 9	at California	W 75–66	10–3 (3–0)	Harmon Gym; Berkeley, CA
January 15, 1966	No. 9	at Stanford	L 69–74	10–4 (3–1)	Burnham Pavilion; Stanford, CA
January 28, 1966*	No. 10	at No. 7 Loyola–Chicago	L 96–102	10–5	Chicago Stadium; Chicago, IL
January 31, 1966*	No. 10	Arizona	W 84–67	11–5	Pauley Pavilion; Los Angeles, CA
February 5, 1966		at Washington State	L 83–84	11–6 (3–2)	Bohler Gymnasium; Pullman, WA
February 7, 1966		at Washington	W 89–67	12–6 (4–2)	Hec Edmundson Pavilion; Seattle, WA
February 11, 1966		Washington State	W 88–61	13–6 (5–2)	Pauley Pavilion; Los Angeles, CA
February 12, 1966		Washington	W 100–71	14–6 (6–2)	Pauley Pavilion; Los Angeles, CA
February 18, 1966		at Oregon State	L 51–64	14–7 (6–3)	Gill Coliseum; Corvallis, OR
February 19, 1966		at Oregon	L 72–79	14–8 (6–4)	McArthur Court; Eugene, OR
February 25, 1966		California	W 95–79	15–8 (7–4)	Pauley Pavilion; Los Angeles, CA
February 26, 1966		Stanford	W 70–58	16–8 (8–4)	Pauley Pavilion; Los Angeles, CA
March 4, 1966		USC	W 94–79	17–8 (9–4)	Pauley Pavilion; Los Angeles, CA
March 5, 1966		at USC	W 99–62	18–8 (10–4)	Los Angeles Memorial Sports Arena; Los Angeles, CA
*Non-conference game. ^{#}Rankings from AP Poll. (#) Tournament seedings in parentheses. All times are in Pacific Time.

== See also ==
- 1966 NCAA Men's Division I Basketball Tournament

== Notes ==
- The team beat USC four times, winning 94–79 at home and 99–62 away the last two games.
- The Bruins lost to Duke twice.

== Team players drafted into the NBA ==
Round	Pick	Player	NBA Team
8	66	Ken Washington	San Francisco Warriors
