= List of University of California, Los Angeles School of Law alumni =

Following is a list of notable alumni of the University of California, Los Angeles School of Law.

== Academia ==
- Drucilla Cornell – professor in political science, comparative literature, and women's studies at Rutgers University; professor of law at Benjamin N. Cardozo School of Law; and Rutgers School of Law–Newark
- Joshua Dressler – professor at the Moritz College of Law, Ohio State University
- Richard D. Freer – professor at Emory University School of Law
- Eric Goldman – professor at the Santa Clara University School of Law
- Richard L. Hasen – professor at the UCLA School of Law and University of California, Irvine School of Law
- George David Kieffer – president of the Board of Governors, California Community Colleges and chair, Regents of the University of California
- Laurie L. Levenson – professor of the Loyola Law School; TV legal commentator, gained fame during Rodney King and O.J. Simpson trials
- Dorothy Wright Nelson – dean of the University of Southern California School of Law and senior judge of the Ninth Circuit Court of Appeals
- Susan Westerberg Prager – president of Occidental College, dean of the UCLA School of Law and Southwestern Law School, provost of Dartmouth College
- Pierre Schlag - University Distinguished Professor, University of Colorado Law School (Boulder)
- Dean Spade – associate professor of law at Seattle University School of Law
- Rebecca Tsosie – Regents Professor and Morris K. Udall Professor of Law at the James E. Rogers College of Law, University of Arizona, associate justice on the Fort McDowell Yavapai Nation Supreme Court (2008–present)
- Eugene Volokh – UCLA Law professor

== Business ==
- Ann Baskins – general counsel of Hewlett-Packard (2000–2006)
- Antonia Hernández – president and CEO of the California Community Foundation, former president and general counsel, MALDEF
- Brian Lee – founder of LegalZoom and The Honest Company
- Abraham M. Lurie – developer of Marina del Rey
- Lowell Milken – co-founder and chairman of the Milken Family Foundation
- Stewart Resnick – president and CEO of The Wonderful Company
- Michael Rich – president and CEO, RAND Corporation
- Nelson Rising – real estate development executive, former CEO of Catellus Development Corporation
- Martine Rothblatt – co-founder of PanAmSat and Sirius Satellite Radio, founder of United Therapeutics
- David P. Steiner – CEO of Waste Management, Inc

== Government ==
- Stewart Baker – assistant secretary for Policy, U.S. Department of Homeland Security
- Janet Dhillon – member of the Equal Employment Opportunity Commission
- Rachel Goslins – executive director, President's Committee on the Arts and Humanities
- Alexander Hoehn-Saric – chairman of the U.S. Consumer Product Safety Commission (2021-2025)
- John Howard – director of the National Institute for Occupational Safety and Health
- Andrei Iancu – Under Secretary of Commerce for Intellectual Property and director of the United States Patent and Trademark Office
- Susan Liebeler – commissioner and chairman of the United States International Trade Commission
- James E. Rogan – director of the United States Patent and Trademark Office, Under Secretary of Commerce for Intellectual Property, and U.S. House of Representatives
- Joshua D. Wright – commissioner of the Federal Trade Commission

== Entertainment ==
- Sondra E. Berchin – executive vice president for MCA Universal
- Thomas Bliss – motion picture producer with credits on over 30 films, including The Hurricane and Air Force One
- Joe Brown – star of court show Judge Joe Brown
- Amy Bruckner – child actor best known for Phil of the Future
- Jeff Cohen – child actor in The Goonies (1985)
- Blye Pagon Faust –- Academy Award-winning film producer best known for Spotlight (2015)
- Robert Fitzpatrick – entertainment attorney, film producer, and music executive; president of Allied Artists International
- Cynthia Gouw – television show host, news anchor, reporter, actress, and model
- Chip Johannessen – writer and producer for several popular television shows
- William B. Keene – presiding judge on the court show Divorce Court
- John Kerr – Tony Award-winning actor best known for Tea and Sympathy
- LegalEagle – YouTuber
- Kalyanee Mam – director and producer of the award-winning documentary A River Changes Course
- George Mastras – Emmy Award-winning writer and producer of Breaking Bad
- Stephan Pastis – creator of the comic strip Pearls Before Swine
- Kelly Perdew – winner of Season 2 of The Apprentice
- Stacey Snider – former co-chair or chair of three film studios: 20th Century Fox, DreamWorks, and Universal
- Howard K. Stern – entertainment lawyer; former domestic partner, attorney, and agent of model and actress Anna Nicole Smith
- Lauren Woodland – Emmy Award-nominated actress
- Ken Ziffren – entertainment attorney, L.A. film czar

== Judiciary ==
- Percy Anderson – United States district judge on the U.S. District Court for the Central District of California
- John Arguelles – associate justice, Supreme Court of California
- Stanley Blumenfeld – United States district judge on the U.S. District Court for the Central District of California
- Kevin Brazile – judge, Superior Court of Los Angeles County; first African American man to serve as presiding judge of the same court
- Janice Rogers Brown – former judge, D.C. Circuit Court of Appeals; former Associate Justice of the Supreme Court of California
- David O. Carter – judge on the U.S. District Court for the Central District of California
- Audrey B. Collins – associate justice of the California Court of Appeal for the Second Appellate District and judge on the U.S. District Court for the Central District of California
- Dale A. Drozd – judge on the United States District Court for the Eastern District of California and Chief United States Magistrate Judge of the same court
- Dolly M. Gee – judge on the U.S. District Court for the Central District of California
- Andrew Guilford – judge on the U.S. District Court for the Central District of California
- Philip S. Gutierrez – judge on the U.S. District Court for the Central District of California
- Sandra Ikuta – judge of the Ninth Circuit Court of Appeals
- Robert Clive Jones – chief judge of the U.S. District Court for the District of Nevada
- William Duffy Keller – judge on the U.S. District Court for the Central District of California
- Alex Kozinski – chief judge of the Ninth Circuit Court of Appeals
- Salvador Mendoza Jr. – judge of the Ninth Circuit Court of Appeals and judge on the U.S. District Court for the Eastern District of Washington
- Jeffrey T. Miller – senior judge of the U.S. District Court for the Southern District of California
- Dorothy Wright Nelson – senior judge of the Ninth Circuit Court of Appeals and dean of the University of Southern California School of Law
- Jacqueline Nguyen – judge of the Ninth Circuit Court of Appeals and the United States District Court for the Central District of California
- Fred W. Slaughter – judge of the U.S. District Court for the Central District of California
- Kim McLane Wardlaw – judge of the Ninth Circuit Court of Appeals
- Paul J. Watford – judge of the Ninth Circuit Court of Appeals

== Law ==
=== Government ===
- Gil Garcetti – Los Angeles County district attorney (1992–2000)
- Casey Gwinn – San Diego city attorney (1996–2004)
- Alicia Limtiaco – United States attorney of Guam

=== Nonprofit ===
- Stewart Kwoh – founder and executive director of the Asian Pacific American Legal Center
- Karen I. Tse – international human rights attorney, activist and director on global nonprofit

=== Private practice ===
- Leslie Abramson – criminal defense attorney who defended Lyle and Erik Menendez and Phil Spector
- John Branca – entertainment lawyer who specializes in representing rock and roll acts, as well as independent investors, music publishing catalogs, and independent music labels
- Harland Braun – criminal defense attorney who defended John Landis and George Folsey Jr. against manslaughter charges in the Twilight Zone: The Movie case
- Leo Terrell – civil rights attorney, talk radio host and television personality

== Literature and journalism ==
- Vincent Bugliosi – author of non-fiction works as Helter Skelter
- Sanam Mahloudji – author
- Robert Rotstein – novelist

== Fine arts ==
- Ragen Moss – artist

== Politics ==
- Howard Berman – U.S. representative from California
- Anna Caballero – California State Assembly member and secretary of the California State and Consumer Services Agency
- Peter Carlisle – mayor of Honolulu and prosecuting attorney of Honolulu
- Lou Correa – California State Assembly member, California state senator, and U.S. representative from California
- David Dawson – Iowa House of Representatives
- Roger Dickinson – California State Assembly
- Mike Eng – California State Assembly
- Lorena Gonzalez Fletcher – California State Assembly member
- Kirsten Gillibrand – United States senator from New York
- José Huizar – Los Angeles City Council member; arrested and indicted on June 23, 2020 on federal corruption charges
- Ysabel Jurado – Los Angeles City Council
- Tim McOsker – Los Angeles City Council member
- Jerry M. Patterson – U.S. representative from California
- James E. Rogan – U.S. representative from California, Under Secretary of Commerce for Intellectual Property, and director of the United States Patent and Trademark Office
- Linda Sánchez – U.S. representative from California
- Henry A. Waxman – U.S. representative from California
- Jack Weiss – Los Angeles City Council member

== Sports ==
- Val Ackerman – former basketball player, first female president of USA Basketball, and president of the WNBA
- Cara Dunne-Yates – blind Paralympic athlete
- Stephen Greenberg – minor league baseball player, later baseball executive and sports agent; son of Hank Greenberg, Hall of Fame slugger for the Detroit Tigers
- Julie Heldman – tennis player
- Larry Nagler – tennis player
