= 1963–64 UCLA Bruins men's basketball team =

American college basketball season

1963–64 UCLA Bruins men's basketball

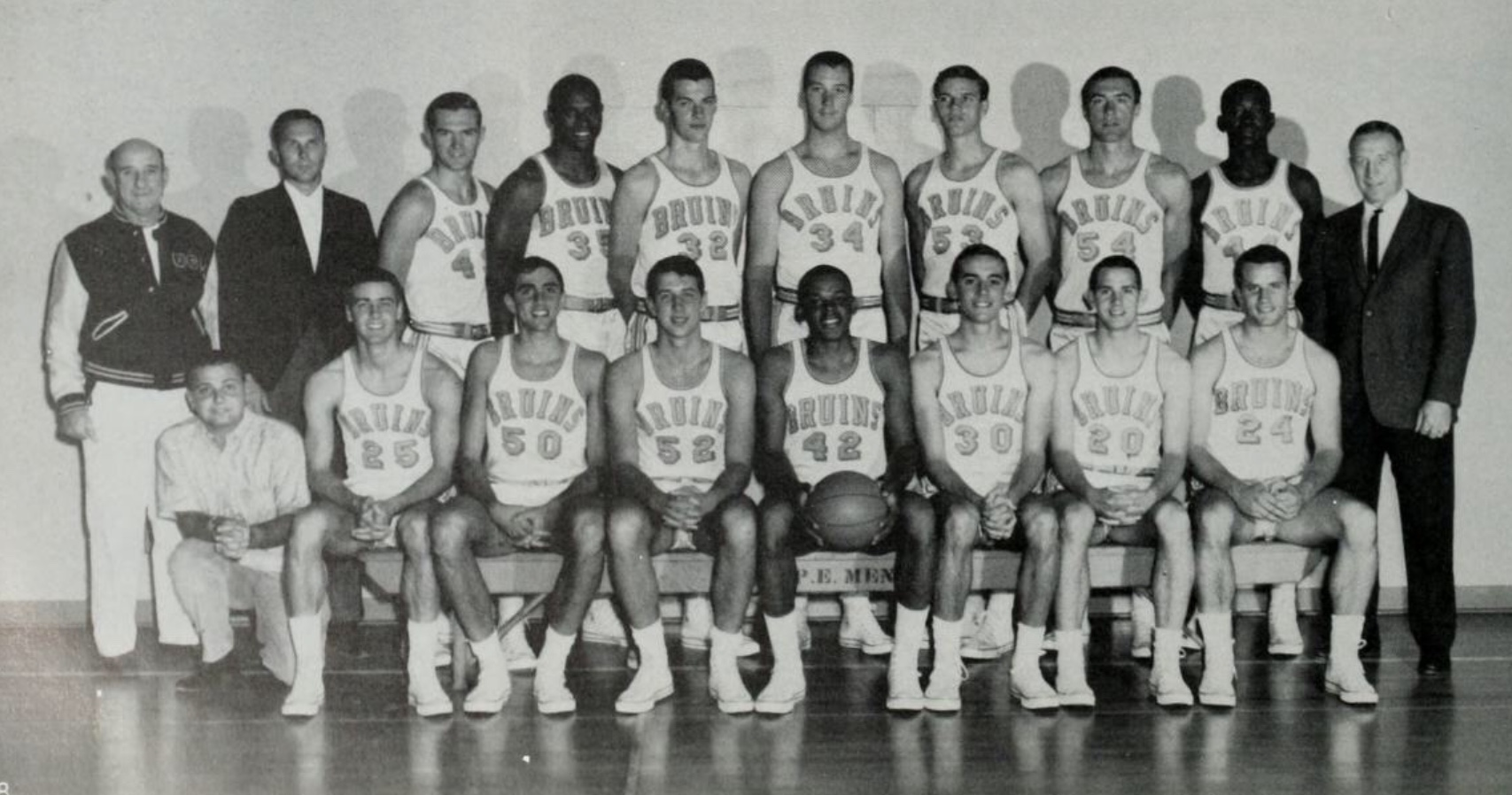

NCAA tournament National champions NCAA regular season champions AAWU regular season champions

National Championship Game, W 98–83 vs. Duke
- Conference: Athletic Association of Western Universities

Ranking
- Coaches: No. 1
- AP: No. 1
- Record: 30–0 (15–0 AAWU)
- Head coach: John Wooden (16th season)
- Assistant coach: Jerry Norman
- Captains: Walt Hazzard; Jack Hirsch
- Home arena: Los Angeles Memorial Sports Arena

1963–64 AAWU Conference men's basketball standings
	Conf.				Overall
Team	W		L	PCT	W		L	PCT
No. 1 UCLA	15	–	0	1.000	30	–	0	1.000
Stanford	9	–	6	.600	15	–	10	.600
California	8	–	7	.533	13	–	14	.481
USC	6	–	9	.400	10	–	16	.385
Washington	5	–	10	.333	9	–	17	.346
Washington State	2	–	13	.133	5	–	21	.192
Rankings from AP Poll

The 1963–64 UCLA Bruins men's basketball team won its first NCAA national championship in basketball under head coach John R. Wooden in his 16th year at UCLA. Assistant coach Jerry Norman convinced a reluctant Wooden to use the zone press, which the team had never utilized. The press quickened the pace of the game and was influential in the first two national titles won by the Bruins, who were undersized.

In the national title game, the Bruins defeated Duke, coached by Vic Bubas, 98–83. Walt Hazzard of UCLA was named the tournament's Most Outstanding Player. It was the team's 30th consecutive win, played before 10,684 fans in Municipal Auditorium, Kansas City, Missouri, March 21, 1964.

High scorers were Gail Goodrich, 27 points; Kenny Washington, 26; Jack Hirsch, 13; and Hazzard, 11. Hazzard, Keith Erickson, and Duke's Jeff Mullins fouled out of the game.

In the semi-final, Erickson and Hazzard scored 28 and 19 points, respectively, to help UCLA to defeat Kansas State 90–84 on March 20.

== Roster ==
1963–64 UCLA Bruins men's basketball team
Players
Coaches

Pos.	#	Name	Height	Weight	Year	Hometown
F	43	Steve Brucker	6 ft 4 in (1.93 m)	—
G	25	Chuck Darrow	5 ft 11 in (1.8 m)	—
F	53	Keith Erickson	6 ft 5 in (1.96 m)	195 lb (88 kg)	Jr	San Francisco, California
G	25	Gail Goodrich	6 ft 1 in (1.85 m)	170 lb (77 kg)	Jr	Los Angeles, California
F	30	Kent Graham	6 ft 3 in (1.91 m)	—
G	42	Walt Hazzard	6 ft 2 in (1.88 m)	185 lb (84 kg)	Sr	Wilmington, Delaware
F	50	Jack Hirsch	6 ft 3 in (1.91 m)	—	Sr	Brooklyn, New York
C	34	Vaughn Hoffman	6 ft 7 in (2.01 m)	—
G	20	Mike Huggins	5 ft 11 in (1.8 m)	—	Sr	Kalispell, Montana
F	52	Rich Levin	6 ft 4 in (1.93 m)	—
C	32	Doug McIntosh	6 ft 7 in (2.01 m)	—	So	Lily, Kentucky
C	35	Fred Slaughter	6 ft 5 in (1.96 m)	—	Sr	Topeka, Kansas
F	54	Kim Stewart	6 ft 5 in (1.96 m)	—
F	44	Kenny Washington	6 ft 3 in (1.91 m)	—	So	Beaufort, South Carolina

Head coach

John Wooden (Purdue)

Assistant coach(es)

- Jerry Norman

Legend

- (C) Team captain
- (S) Suspended
- (I) Ineligible
- (W) Walk-on
- Injured
- Current redshirt

Roster
Last update: 26 September 2017

== Schedule ==
Date time, TV	Rank^{#}	Opponent^{#}	Result	Record	Site city, state
Regular Season
December 6, 1963*		BYU	W 113–71	1–0	Los Angeles Memorial Sports Arena; Los Angeles, CA
December 7, 1963*		Butler	W 80–65	2–0	Los Angeles Memorial Sports Arena; Los Angeles, CA
December 13, 1963*		vs. Kansas State	W 78–75	3–0	Allen Fieldhouse; Lawrence, KS
December 14, 1963*		vs. Kansas	W 74–54	4–0	Ahearn Field House; Manhattan, KS
December 20, 1963*	No. 6	vs. Baylor	W 112–61	5–0	Long Beach Arena; Long Beach, CA
December 21, 1963*	No. 6	vs. Creighton	W 95-79	6–0	Long Beach Arena; Long Beach, CA
December 26, 1963*	No. 4	Yale; L.A. Classic	W 95–65	7–0	Los Angeles Memorial Sports Arena; Los Angeles, CA
December 27, 1963*	No. 4	No. 3 Michigan; L.A. Classic	W 98–80	8–0	Los Angeles Memorial Sports Arena (14,241); Los Angeles, CA
December 28, 1963*	No. 4	Illinois; L.A. Classic	W 83–79	9–0	Los Angeles Memorial Sports Arena; Los Angeles, CA
January 3, 1964	No. 2	at Washington State	W 88–83	10–0 (1–0)	Bohler Gymnasium; Pullman, WA
January 4, 1964	No. 2	at Washington State	W 121–77	11–0 (2–0)	Bohler Gymnasium; Pullman, WA
January 10, 1964	No. 1	USC	W 79–59	12–0 (3–0)	Los Angeles Memorial Sports Arena; Los Angeles, CA
January 11, 1964	No. 1	USC	W 78–71	13–0 (4–0)	Los Angeles Memorial Sports Arena; Los Angeles, CA
January 17, 1964	No. 1	Stanford	W 84–71	14–0 (5–0)	Los Angeles Memorial Sports Arena; Los Angeles, CA
January 18, 1964	No. 1	Stanford	W 80–61	15–0 (6–0)	Santa Monica City College; Santa Monica, CA
January 31, 1964*	No. 1	UC Santa Barbara	W 107–76	16–0	Robertson Gymnasium; Santa Barbara, CA
February 1, 1964*	No. 1	UC Santa Barbara	W 87–59	17–0	Santa Monica City College; Santa Monica, CA
February 7, 1964	No. 1	at California	W 87–67	18–0 (7–0)	Harmon Gym; Berkeley, CA
February 8, 1964	No. 1	at California	W 58–56	19–0 (8–0)	Harmon Gym; Berkeley, CA
February 14, 1964	No. 1	at Washington	W 73–58	20–0 (9–0)	Los Angeles Memorial Sports Arena; Los Angeles, CA
February 15, 1964	No. 1	at Washington	W 88–60	21–0 (10–0)	Los Angeles Memorial Sports Arena; Los Angeles, CA
February 22, 1964	No. 1	at Stanford	W 100–88	22–0 (11–0)	Burnham Pavilion; Stanford, CA
February 24, 1964	No. 1	at Washington	W 78–64	23–0 (12–0)	Hec Edmundson Pavilion; Seattle, WA
February 29, 1964	No. 1	at Washington State	W 93–56	24–0 (13–0)	Los Angeles Memorial Sports Arena; Los Angeles, CA
March 2, 1964	No. 1	at California	W 87–57	25–0 (14–0)	Los Angeles Memorial Sports Arena; Los Angeles, CA
March 6, 1964	No. 1	at USC	W 91–81	26–0 (15–0)	Los Angeles Memorial Sports Arena; Los Angeles, CA
NCAA Tournament
March 13, 1964	No. 1	vs. Seattle; Regional semifinals	W 95–90	27–0	Gill Coliseum; Corvallis, OR
March 14, 1964	No. 1	vs. San Francisco; Regional Finals	W 76–72	28–0	Gill Coliseum; Corvallis, OR
March 20, 1964	No. 1	vs. Kansas State; National semifinals	W 90–84	29–0	Municipal Auditorium; Kansas, City, MO
March 21, 1964	No. 1	vs. No. 3 Duke; National Championship Game	W 98–83	30–0	Municipal Auditorium; Kansas City, MO
*Non-conference game. ^{#}Rankings from AP Poll. (#) Tournament seedings in parentheses. All times are in Pacific Time.

== Notes ==
- In the Los Angeles Basketball Classic, UCLA defeated then third-ranked Michigan, 98–80 in front of 14,241 in the Sports Arena.
- The half time National Championship game score was UCLA 50, Duke 38.
- Duke's height was no advantage. Duke had two 6-foot-10-inch (2.08 m) players — Hack Tison and Jay Buckley.
- By winning the Championships, six Bruins automatically qualified for trials on the United States Olympic basketball team.
- Hazzard received All-American honors for the second consecutive season, and was named the nation's Player of the Year by the Helms Athletic Foundation/USBWA.
- Hazzard finished the season with 1,401 points, the all-time leading scorer.
- Goodrich and Hirsch were named All-AAWU first team.
- Wooden was the UPI's Coach of the Year for the first time.
- The team will be inducted into the National Collegiate Basketball Hall of Fame as part of the Class of 2020 in 2021.

== Draft list ==
- Walt Hazzard was number 1 draft pick in the NBA draft of 1964 by the Los Angeles Lakers.
