= Kenny Washington =

Kenny Washington may refer to:

- Kenny Washington (American football) (1918–1971), American football player
- Kenny Washington (basketball), American basketball player and coach
- Kenny Washington (musician) (born 1958), American jazz musician
- Kenneth Washington (born 1946), American actor
