= 1964–65 UCLA Bruins men's basketball team =

American college basketball season

1964–65 UCLA Bruins men's basketball

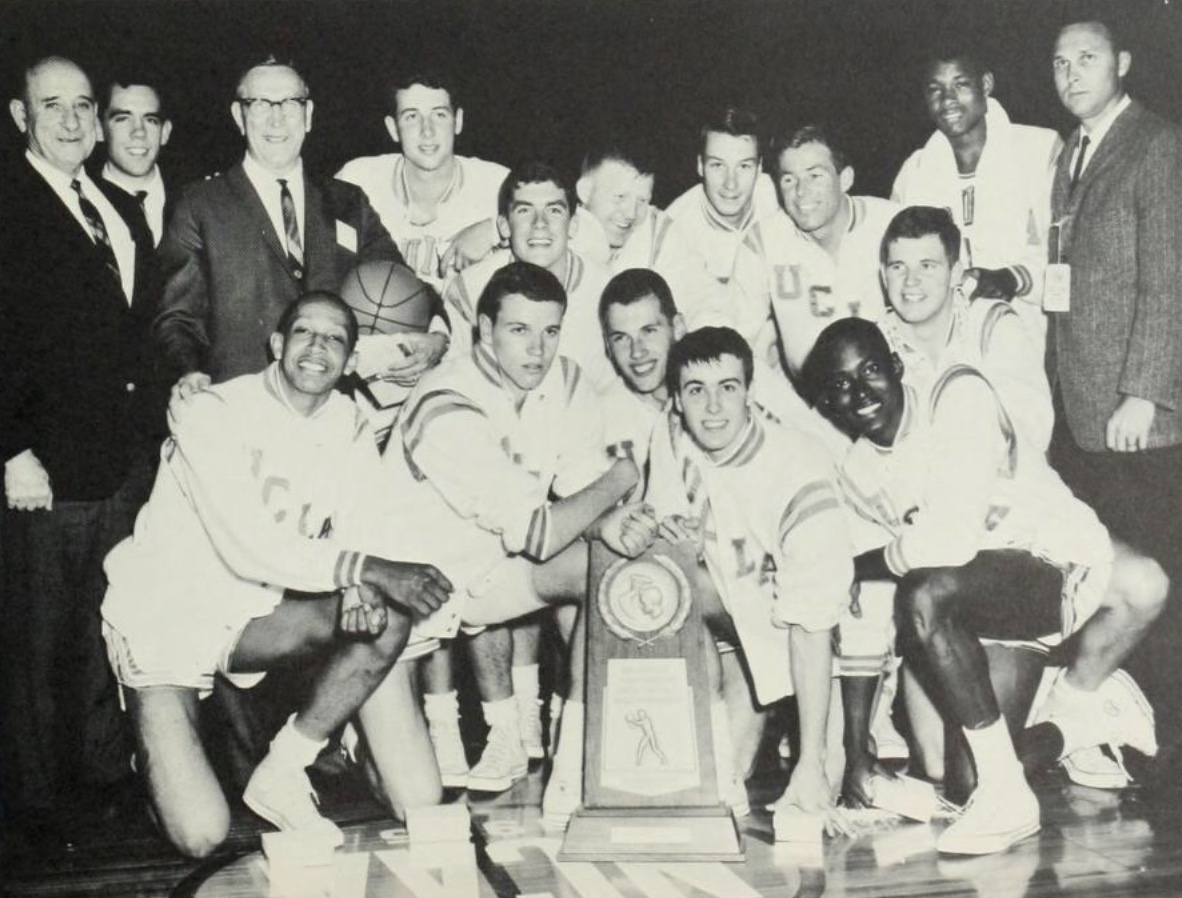

NCAA tournament National champions AAWU regular season champions

National Championship Game, W 91–80 vs. Michigan
- Conference: Athletic Association of Western Universities

Ranking
- Coaches: No. 2
- AP: No. 2
- Record: 28–2 (14–0 Pac-8)
- Head coach: John Wooden (17th season)
- Assistant coach: Jerry Norman
- Home arena: Los Angeles Memorial Sports Arena; Los Angeles, California

1964–65 AAWU Conference men's basketball standings
	Conf.				Overall
Team	W		L	PCT	W		L	PCT
No. 2 UCLA	14	–	0	1.000	28	–	2	.933
Stanford	9	–	5	.643	15	–	8	.652
USC	8	–	6	.571	14	–	12	.538
Oregon State	7	–	7	.500	16	–	10	.615
Washington State	6	–	8	.429	9	–	17	.346
Washington	5	–	9	.357	9	–	16	.360
California	4	–	10	.286	8	–	15	.348
Oregon	3	–	11	.214	9	–	17	.346
As of November 25, 2011; Rankings from AP Poll

The 1964–65 UCLA Bruins men's basketball team won its second NCAA national championship under head coach John Wooden.

At Memorial Coliseum in Portland, Oregon, the #2 Bruins successfully defended their national title with a 91–80 win over top-ranked Michigan before 13,204. Gail Goodrich's 42 points and Kenny Washington's 17 points helped UCLA to become the fifth team to win consecutive championships. Wooden liked Goodrich for his "poise, quickness and speed."

After dropping the season opener at Illinois in early December, the Bruins finished the season with a 28–2 record, winning the last fifteen games and scoring a team record of 400 points in the four tournament games. Brigham Young, San Francisco, and Wichita State were also eliminated by the Bruins. This was Wooden's 17th season at UCLA.

== Roster ==
1964–65 UCLA Bruins men's basketball team
Players
Coaches

Pos.	#	Name	Height	Weight	Year	Hometown
F	53	Keith Erickson	6 ft 5 in (1.96 m)	195 lb (88 kg)	Sr	San Francisco, California
G	22	John Galbraith	6 ft 2 in (1.88 m)	—
G	25	Gail Goodrich	6 ft 1 in (1.85 m)	170 lb (77 kg)	Sr	Los Angeles, California
G	40	Freddie Goss	6 ft 1 in (1.85 m)	—	Jr
G	43	Brice Chambers	6 ft 2 in (1.88 m)	—
C	34	Vaughn Hoffman	6 ft 7 in (2.01 m)	—	Jr
F	54	Edgar Lacey	6 ft 6 in (1.98 m)	—	So	Los Angeles, California
F	52	Rich Levin	6 ft 4 in (1.93 m)	—
F	35	Mike Lynn	6 ft 7 in (2.01 m)	215 lb (98 kg)	So	Covina, California
G	20	John Lyons	6 ft 0 in (1.83 m)	—
C	32	Doug McIntosh	6 ft 7 in (2.01 m)	—	Jr	Lily, Kentucky
G	42	Mike Serafin	6 ft 3 in (1.91 m)	—
F	44	Kenny Washington	6 ft 3 in (1.91 m)	—	Jr	Beaufort, South Carolina
F	55	Bill Winkelholz	6 ft 8 in (2.03 m)	—

Head coach

John Wooden (Purdue)

Assistant coach(es)

- Jerry Norman

Legend

- (C) Team captain
- (S) Suspended
- (I) Ineligible
- (W) Walk-on
- Injured
- Current redshirt

Roster

== Schedule ==
Date time, TV	Rank^{#}	Opponent^{#}	Result	Record	Site city, state
Regular Season
December 4, 1964*	No. 2	at Illinois	L 83–110	0–1	Assembly Hall; Champaign, IL
December 5, 1964*	No. 2	at Indiana State	W 112–76	1–1	Indiana State College Arena; Terre Haute, IN
December 11, 1964*	No. 7	Arizona State	W 107–76	2–1	Los Angeles Memorial Sports Arena; Los Angeles, CA
December 12, 1964*	No. 7	Oklahoma State	W 68–52	3–1	Los Angeles Memorial Sports Arena; Los Angeles, CA
December 18, 1964	No. 5	at Marquette; Milwaukee Classic	W 61–52	4–1	Milwaukee Arena; Milwaukee, WI
December 19, 1964	No. 5	vs. Boston College; Milwaukee Classic	W 61–52	5–1	Milwaukee Arena; Milwaukee, WI
December 22, 1964	No. 4	at USC	W 84–75	6–1 (1–0)	Los Angeles Memorial Sports Arena; Los Angeles, CA
December 28, 1964*	No. 4	Arizona; Los Angeles Classic	W 99–79	7–1	Los Angeles Memorial Sports Arena; Los Angeles, CA
December 29, 1964*	No. 4	Minnesota; Los Angeles Classic	W 93–77	8–1	Los Angeles Memorial Sports Arena; Los Angeles, CA
December 30, 1964*	No. 4	Utah; Los Angeles Classic	W 104–74	9–1	Los Angeles Memorial Sports Arena; Los Angeles, CA
January 8, 1965	No. 1	at Oregon	W 91–74	10–1 (2–0)	McArthur Court; Eugene, OR
January 9, 1965	No. 1	at Oregon State	W 83–53	11–1 (3–0)	Gill Coliseum; Corvallis, OR
January 15, 1965	No. 1	California	W 76–54	12–1 (4–0)	Los Angeles Memorial Sports Arena; Los Angeles, CA
January 16, 1965	No. 1	Stanford	W 80–66	13–1 (5–0)	Los Angeles Memorial Sports Arena; Los Angeles, CA
January 29, 1965*	No. 1	vs. Iowa	L 82–87	13–2	Chicago Stadium; Chicago, IL
January 30, 1965*	No. 1	at Loyola–Chicago	W 85–72	14–2	Chicago Stadium; Chicago, IL
February 5, 1965	No. 2	Washington State	W 93–41	15–2 (5–0)	Los Angeles Memorial Sports Arena; Los Angeles, CA
February 6, 1965	No. 2	Washington	W 78–75	16–2 (6–0)	Los Angeles Memorial Sports Arena; Los Angeles, CA
February 12, 1965	No. 2	at Washington	W 83–73	17–2 (7–0)	Hec Edmundson Pavilion; Seattle, WA
February 13, 1965	No. 2	at Washington State	W 70–68	18–2 (8–0)	Bohler Gymnasium; Pullman, WA
February 19, 1965	No. 2	Oregon State	W 83–73	19–2 (9–0)	Los Angeles Memorial Sports Arena; Los Angeles, CA
February 20, 1965	No. 2	Oregon	W 70–68	20–2 (10–0)	Los Angeles Memorial Sports Arena; Los Angeles, CA
February 26, 1965	No. 2	at Stanford	W 83–67	21–2 (11–0)	Burnham Pavilion; Stanford, CA
February 27, 1965	No. 2	at California	W 83–68	22–2 (12–0)	Harmon Gym; Berkeley, CA
March 5, 1965	No. 2	USC	W 77–71	23–2 (13–0)	Los Angeles Memorial Sports Arena; Los Angeles, CA
March 6, 1965	No. 2	USC	W 52–50	24–2 (14–0)	Los Angeles Memorial Sports Arena; Los Angeles, CA
NCAA Tournament
March 12, 1965*; 8:30 pm	No. 2	at No. 9 BYU; Regional semifinals	W 100–76	25–2	Smith Fieldhouse (10,766); Provo, UT
March 13, 1965*; 8:00 pm	No. 2	vs. San Francisco; Regional Finals	W 101–93	26–2	Smith Fieldhouse (10,515); Provo, UT
March 19, 1965*; 9:00 pm	No. 2	vs. Wichita State; National semifinals	W 108–89	27–2	Memorial Coliseum (13,197); Portland, OR
March 20, 1965*; 7:00 pm	No. 2	vs. No. 1 Michigan; National Championship	W 91–80	28–2	Memorial Coliseum (13,204); Portland, OR
*Non-conference game. ^{#}Rankings from AP Poll. (#) Tournament seedings in parentheses. All times are in Pacific time.

== Notes ==
- UCLA began the season ranked first in both major polls.
- Half time score of the championship game was UCLA 47, Michigan 34.
- UCLA hit .569 of its shots, while Michigan hit .516.
- Gail Goodrich was a first team All-American
