= 1964–65 Washington State Cougars men's basketball team =

American college basketball season

1964–65 Washington State Cougars men's basketball
- Conference: Athletic Association of Western Universities
- Record: 9–17 (6–8 AAWU, Pac-8)
- Head coach: Marv Harshman (7th season)
- Home arena: Bohler Gymnasium

1964–65 AAWU Conference men's basketball standings
	Conf.				Overall
Team	W		L	PCT	W		L	PCT
No. 2 UCLA	14	–	0	1.000	28	–	2	.933
Stanford	9	–	5	.643	15	–	8	.652
USC	8	–	6	.571	14	–	12	.538
Oregon State	7	–	7	.500	16	–	10	.615
Washington State	6	–	8	.429	9	–	17	.346
Washington	5	–	9	.357	9	–	16	.360
California	4	–	10	.286	8	–	15	.348
Oregon	3	–	11	.214	9	–	17	.346
As of November 25, 2011; Rankings from AP Poll

The 1964–65 Washington State Cougars men's basketball team represented Washington State University for the 1964–65 NCAA college basketball season. Led by seventh-year head coach Marv Harshman, the Cougars were members of the Athletic Association of Western Universities (AAWU, Pac-8) and played their home games on campus at Bohler Gymnasium in Pullman, Washington.

The Cougars were 9–17 overall in the regular season and 6–8 in conference play, fifth in the standings.
