= 1965–66 Washington Huskies men's basketball team =

American college basketball season

1965–66 Washington Huskies men's basketball
- Conference: Athletic Association of Western Universities
- Record: 10–15 (4–10 AAWU, Pac-8)
- Head coach: Mac Duckworth (3rd season)
- Home arena: Hec Edmundson Pavilion

1965–66 AAWU Conference men's basketball standings
	Conf.				Overall
Team	W		L	PCT	W		L	PCT
Oregon State	12	–	2	.857	21	–	7	.750
UCLA	10	–	4	.714	18	–	8	.692
Stanford	8	–	6	.571	13	–	12	.520
Washington State	6	–	8	.429	15	–	11	.577
Oregon	6	–	8	.429	13	–	13	.500
USC	6	–	8	.429	13	–	13	.500
Washington	4	–	10	.286	10	–	15	.400
California	4	–	10	.286	9	–	16	.360
Rankings from AP Poll

The 1965–66 Washington Huskies men's basketball team represented the University of Washington for the 1965–66 NCAA University Division basketball season. Led by third-year head coach Mac Duckworth, the Huskies were members of the Athletic Association of Western Universities (Pacific-8) and played their home games on campus at Hec Edmundson Pavilion in Seattle, Washington.

The Huskies were 10–15 overall in the regular season and 4–10 in conference play, tied for last in the standings.
