= Freddie Goss =

American retired college basketball player and coach

Playing career
- 1962–1966: UCLA
- Position: Guard

Coaching career (HC unless noted)
- 1969–1979: UC Riverside
- 1979–1985: US International

Head coaching record
- Overall: 199–235 (.459)

Accomplishments and honors

Championships
- NCAA champion (1965)

Awards
- Second-team All-AAWU (1965); Second-team Parade All-American (1961)

Freddie Goss is an American retired college basketball player and coach.

Goss played at UCLA under Hall of Fame coach John Wooden from 1962 to 1966 and started at guard with All-American Gail Goodrich on the Bruins' 1964–65 national championship team.

After his playing days were over, Goss became a college coach. His first stint was at UC Riverside, where he coached from 1969 to 1979, amassing a record of 163–110 (.597). He then moved to US International University in San Diego, where he led the Gulls' move to division I. Goss went 36–110 in his six years at the school.

== Head coaching record ==
=== College basketball ===
Record table
Season	Team	Overall	Conference	Standing	Postseason
UC Riverside (California Collegiate Athletic Association) (1969–1979)
1969–70	UC Riverside	19–10	7–1	1st	NCAA College Final Four
1970–71	UC Riverside	14–10	3–5	3rd	
1971–72	UC Riverside	19–9	5–3	T-1st	NCAA College Regional Third Place
1972–73	UC Riverside	25–5	8–2	1st	NCAA College Elite Eight
1973–74	UC Riverside	21–8	6–4	1st	NCAA II Elite Eight
1974–75	UC Riverside	19–9	6–2	1st	NCAA II Elite Eight
1975–76	UC Riverside	9–17	4–6	4th	
1976–77	UC Riverside	11–15	4–6	5th	
1977–78	UC Riverside	4–23	0–10	5th	
1978–79	UC Riverside	21–5	9–3	T-1st	NCAA II Regional Final
UC Riverside:		162–111 (.619)	52–42 (.655)		
US International (NCAA II Independent)) (1979–1982)
1979–80	UC International				
1980–81	UC International				
US International (NCAA I Independent)) (1981–1985)
1981–82	UC International	9–18			
1982–83	UC International	3–25			
1983–84	UC International	2–26			
1984–85	UC International	1–27			
US International:		35–126 (.619)			
Total:		199–235 (.619)			
National champion Postseason invitational champion Conference regular season champion Conference regular season and conference tournament champion Division regular season champion Division regular season and conference tournament champion Conference tournament champion
