= Jack Hirsch =

American basketball player and coach

Personal information
- Born: 1941 or 1942 (age 84–85) New York City, New York, U.S.
- Listed height: 6 ft 3 in (1.91 m)

Career information
- High school: Van Nuys (Van Nuys, California)
- College: Los Angeles Valley (1959–1961); UCLA (1962–1964)
- NBA draft: 1964: undrafted
- Position: Forward
- Number: 50

Career history

Coaching
- 1980–1982: Compton (assistant)
- 1982–1984: Chapman (assistant)
- 1984–1988: UCLA (assistant)

Career highlights
- NCAA champion (1964); First-team All-AAWU (1964); Second-team All-AAWU (1963)

Jack Hirsch (born 1941 or 1942) is an American former college basketball player for the UCLA Bruins. He was the starting forward on the Bruins' national championship team in 1964, when he served as co-captain along with Walt Hazzard. Hirsch also earned all-conference honors that season. He later became an assistant coach in college, and served as the top assistant to Hazzard. Hazzard and Hirsch coached at UCLA from 1984 to 1988. Hirsch was inducted into the UCLA Athletics Hall of Fame in 2012.

== Early life ==
Hirsch was born and raised in Brooklyn in New York City in an affluent Jewish family. His father ran a successful chain of bowling alleys. Hirsch attended a school of predominantly black students, and he played basketball on the asphalt courts of the Bedford–Stuyvesant neighborhood. His family moved to the Los Angeles district of Van Nuys when he was 14. In his senior year at Van Nuys High School, the 6-foot-3-inch (1.91 m) center won All-City Co-Player of the Year honors.

== College career ==
After high school, Hirsch attended junior college at Los Angeles Valley College for two years from 1959 to 1961, where he was a two-time All-Metropolitan Conference player. He attended the University of California, Los Angeles (UCLA) as a favor to his father, who promised to quit his five-packs-a-day smoking habit.

Hirsch played for the Bruins from 1961 to 1964, starting at forward in his last two seasons. In 1963–64, the Bruins won the National Collegiate Athletic Association (NCAA) championship, coach John Wooden's first title and the beginning of a UCLA dynasty that would claim nine of the next 11 championships. Recognizing Hirsch's defensive skills, Wooden assigned him to their opponent's top player. Serving as co-captain of the team along with Walt Hazzard, Hirsch averaged 14.0 points along with 7.6 rebounds per game, and he earned first-team All-AAWU honors that season.

In 1994, the Los Angeles Times wrote that "Hirsch has become the least-known member of the starting five from 1963–64."

In 1991 he was inducted into the Southern California Jewish Sports Hall of Fame. He was inducted into the UCLA Athletics Hall of Fame in 2012.

== Coaching career ==
Former UCLA teammate Hazzard became a head coach, and Hirsch was his top assistant starting at Compton College in 1980 for two years and Chapman College for another two. He followed Hazzard to UCLA in 1984. After Hazzard was fired by the school following the 1987–88 season, Hirsch was reassigned and finished his career at UCLA working as an administrative analyst in the assistant chancellor's office until 1990.

== Personal life ==
Hirsch became a millionaire from the family bowling business. His family had gone into the pornography industry, which he said back in 1984 was "infinitely cleaner" than college recruiting.
