= 1963–64 Washington Huskies men's basketball team =

American college basketball season

1963–64 Washington Huskies men's basketball
- Conference: Athletic Association of Western Universities
- Record: 9–17 (5–10 AAWU, Big Six)
- Head coach: Mac Duckworth (1st season)
- Home arena: Hec Edmundson Pavilion

1963–64 AAWU Conference men's basketball standings
	Conf.				Overall
Team	W		L	PCT	W		L	PCT
No. 1 UCLA	15	–	0	1.000	30	–	0	1.000
Stanford	9	–	6	.600	15	–	10	.600
California	8	–	7	.533	13	–	14	.481
USC	6	–	9	.400	10	–	16	.385
Washington	5	–	10	.333	9	–	17	.346
Washington State	2	–	13	.133	5	–	21	.192
Rankings from AP Poll

The 1963–64 Washington Huskies men's basketball team represented the University of Washington for the 1963–64 NCAA University Division basketball season. Led by first-year head coach Mac Duckworth, the Huskies were members of the Athletic Association of Western Universities (Big Six) and played their home games on campus at Hec Edmundson Pavilion in Seattle, Washington.

The Huskies were 9–17 overall in the regular season and 5–10 in conference play, fifth in the standings.

Athletic director Jim Owens promoted Duckworth to head coach in April 1963, and led the Huskies for five years. He was previously an assistant at Washington for three seasons under John Grayson.
