= National Basketball Referees Association =

NBRA
- National Basketball Referees Association
- Founded: 1977
- Website: www.nbra.net

The National Basketball Referees Association (NBRA) is the labor union that represents National Basketball Association (NBA), G League, and Women's National Basketball Association (WNBA) referees. It was founded in 1977.

== History ==
The National Basketball Officials Association was formed in 1973 to improve the labor environment for NBA referees. The association became a labor union in 1977. Originally formed as the National Association of Basketball Referees, the union settled on its current name during its negotiations for a collective bargaining agreement.

=== 1977 Strike ===
Led by Richie Phillips, the NBRA's first major action was an effort to win a collective bargaining agreement. The NBA was contracting officials individually at that point. The 24-member union decided to strike during the 1977 playoffs, for maximum visibility. Phillips called a strike on April 10, the last day of the regular season. The union was seeking higher wages, severance, and arbitration for fired officials. The NBA PLayers Association had a no-strike clause at that point, and they refused to strike in solidarity. Some players and coaches felt the game was improved by their absence.

The NBA responded by hiring replacement referees from the Eastern Basketball League and elsewhere. Costing only $300 per game, plus a $40 per diem, the NBA made do with scabs until their inferior officiating caused complaints from players and fans. The NBA agreed to recognize the NBRA as a negotiating partner and the two eventually agreed to a contract.

=== 1983 Strike ===
When their first CBA expired in 1983, the NBRA asked for a 48% wage increase. Referees' starting salary was $24,000, and they averaged $40,000, while NBA players averaged $248,000. As before, the NBA replaced them, and the results were so poor that Dick Young wrote, "The fill-in officials are brutal. I thought I was watching...a steel cage match. Palming? I don't believe these substitute refs know what palming is. And traveling? Forget it. There is no such violation...Next thing you know, the NBA players will be putting the ball under their arm like a running back."

The strike lasted from the beginning of the season until December 16.

=== 1995 Lockout ===
The NBA locked out the referees because the NBRA rejected the league's request for a no-strike clause in their contract. The NBA was offering a 30% wage increase over 5 years from the 1995–96 season, while the union was asking for a 70% increase in the first year of a new contract. The NBA again used replacement referees and reduced the size of game crews from 3 officials to 2.

Under Fred Slaughter, the NBRA held out until early December. In a 27–26 vote (with 2 members not voting), the union agreed to a new 5-year contract that would see starting salaries increase to $90,000 and top salaries to $328,000.

=== WNBA ===
In 2017, the NBRA negotiated the WNBA's first collective bargaining agreement with its referees. The contract resulted in a 66% wage increase and a 401(k).
