= Central High School & Boys Vocational School =

- U.S. National Register of Historic Places
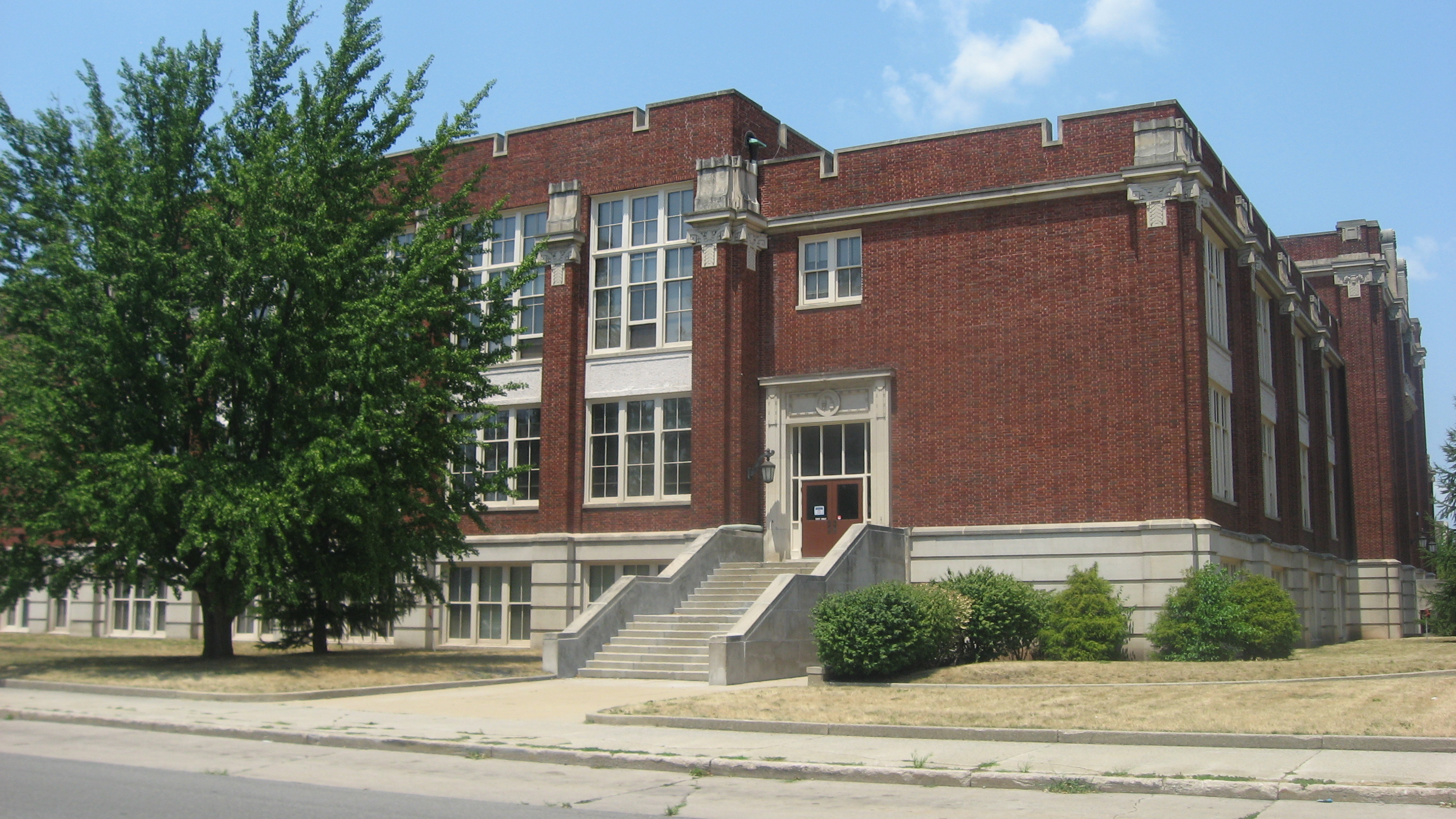
- Central High School & Boys Vocational School, July 2012

- Location within Indiana Location within the United States
- Location: 115 N. James Court, South Bend, Indiana
- Coordinates: 41°40′37″N 86°15′17″W
- Area: 4 acres (1.6 ha)
- Built: 1911-1913, c. 1918, 1928
- Architect: Ittner, William B.
- MPS: Downtown South Bend Historic MRA
- NRHP reference No.: 85001206
- Added to NRHP: June 5, 1985

South Bend Central High School (originally called South Bend High School) is a historic high school complex located at 303 West Colfax Avenue in South Bend, Indiana, U.S. It was built between 1911 and 1913, and is a two- to three-story, eclectic red brick building with limestone trim. It sits on a raised foundation. Located behind the main building is the two-story former Vocational Building, built about 1918, that was incorporated into the main building in 1928. The school closed as a high school in 1970. The building was later used for middle school classes and adult education programs.

The school was known for strong academics, top athletic teams and school spirit. The Central Bears basketball team won two Indiana state championships, four semi-state championships, 12 regional championships, and 28 sectional championships. Famed UCLA basketball coach John Wooden coached basketball and baseball teams for nine years at Central, before entering the United States Navy. The school's basketball team was featured in the 1986 film Hoosiers as the fictional team that lost the 1952 Indiana state championship basketball game to the fictional Hickory High School, which in the film had an enrollment of 64 students. The film was based on the 1954 Milan High School basketball team, which did win the Indiana High School Boys Basketball Tournament championship in 1954. With an enrollment of only 161, Milan was the smallest school ever to win a single-class state basketball title in Indiana, beating a team from the much larger Muncie Central High School in a classic game known as the Milan Miracle.

The South Central school building was listed on the National Register of Historic Places in 1985.

In 1995, the building was converted into 106 apartments, each with a unique floor plan containing features preserved from the original building, including a part of the old school gym that still bears the original painted floor lines in one apartment; another has a sunken living room which was a part of the school's indoor pool with depth markings intact. Several other apartments have original classroom chalkboards on the walls. The complex, which is privately owned, is known as Central High Apartments.
