= Dickran Tevrizian =

American judge

Dickran M. Tevrizian Jr.
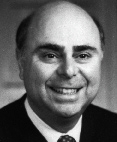

Senior Judge of the United States District Court for the Central District of California
- In office August 5, 2005 – April 19, 2007

Judge of the United States District Court for the Central District of California
- In office December 17, 1985 – August 5, 2005
- Appointed by: Ronald Reagan
- Preceded by: Seat established by 98 Stat. 333
- Succeeded by: Andrew J. Guilford

Judge of the Los Angeles County Superior Court
- In office 1978–1982

Judge of the Los Angeles Municipal Court
- In office 1972–1978

Personal details
- Born: Dickran Mardivos Tevrizian, Jr. August 4, 1940 (age 85) Los Angeles, California
- Spouse: Geraldine A. Vanley
- Education: University of Southern California (BS, JD)

Dickran Mardivos Tevrizian Jr. (born August 4, 1940) is a retired United States district judge of the United States District Court for the Central District of California. Confirmed in 1985, he is the first United States federal judge of Armenian ancestry. He is currently a mediator and arbitrator with JAMS.

== Education and career ==
Tervizian was born in 1940 to Armenian parents in Los Angeles, California. His father immigrated from Harpoot (present-day Elaziğ, Turkey) while his mother’s family came from Sivas (present-day Turkey). Tevrizian received a Bachelor of Science degree in finance from the University of Southern California in 1962 and a Juris Doctor from the USC Gould School of Law in 1965. While at USC, Tevrizian was a member of the Gamma Tau Chapter of the Beta Theta Pi fraternity. In 1994, he was awarded the Oxford Cup, the highest honor a brother of Beta Theta Pi can receive. He was a tax accountant with Arthur Andersen and Company in Los Angeles from 1965 to 1966, and then in private practice in Los Angeles until 1972. He was a judge of the Los Angeles Municipal Court from 1972 to 1978. He was a judge of the California Superior Court in Los Angeles from 1978 to 1982, returning to private practice in Los Angeles from 1982 to 1985, and expanding his practice to Pasadena from 1985 to 1986.

== Federal judicial service ==
On November 7, 1985, Tevrizian was nominated by President Ronald Reagan to a new seat on the United States District Court for the Central District of California created by 98 Stat. 333. He was confirmed by the United States Senate on December 16, 1985, and received his commission the following day. Tevrizian assumed senior status on August 5, 2005, and retired completely from the bench on April 19, 2007.

== Notable cases ==
Tevrizian sentenced Barry Minkow, the criminal teenage entrepreneur who has since become a Christian minister and anti-fraud detective, to prison in 1987. He also sentenced Jurijus Kadamovas and Iouri Mikhel to death in 2007. The men were foreign nationals who had murdered a total of five people.

== Post judicial service ==
Currently, he is a neutral (mediator and arbitrator) with JAMS, active as of March 2018.

== See also ==
- List of first minority male lawyers and judges in the United States

== Sources ==
Legal offices
Preceded by Seat established by 98 Stat. 333	Judge of the United States District Court for the Central District of California; 1985–2005	Succeeded by Andrew J. Guilford
