= 1965–66 Washington State Cougars men's basketball team =

American college basketball season

1965–66 Washington State Cougars men's basketball
- Conference: Athletic Association of Western Universities
- Record: 15–11 (6–8 AAWU, Pac-8)
- Head coach: Marv Harshman (8th season)
- Home arena: Bohler Gymnasium

1965–66 AAWU Conference men's basketball standings
	Conf.				Overall
Team	W		L	PCT	W		L	PCT
Oregon State	12	–	2	.857	21	–	7	.750
UCLA	10	–	4	.714	18	–	8	.692
Stanford	8	–	6	.571	13	–	12	.520
Washington State	6	–	8	.429	15	–	11	.577
Oregon	6	–	8	.429	13	–	13	.500
USC	6	–	8	.429	13	–	13	.500
Washington	4	–	10	.286	10	–	15	.400
California	4	–	10	.286	9	–	16	.360
Rankings from AP Poll

The 1965–66 Washington State Cougars men's basketball team represented Washington State University for the 1965–66 NCAA college basketball season. Led by eighth-year head coach Marv Harshman, the Cougars were members of the Athletic Association of Western Universities (AAWU, Pac-8) and played their home games on campus at Bohler Gymnasium in Pullman, Washington.

The Cougars were 15–11 overall in the regular season and 6–8 in conference play, tied for fourth in the standings.

The fifteen wins were the most for Washington State in fourteen years.
