= 1964–65 Washington Huskies men's basketball team =

American college basketball season

1964–65 Washington Huskies men's basketball
- Conference: Athletic Association of Western Universities
- Record: 9–16 (5–9 AAWU, Pac-8)
- Head coach: Mac Duckworth (2nd season)
- Home arena: Hec Edmundson Pavilion

1964–65 AAWU Conference men's basketball standings
	Conf.				Overall
Team	W		L	PCT	W		L	PCT
No. 2 UCLA	14	–	0	1.000	28	–	2	.933
Stanford	9	–	5	.643	15	–	8	.652
USC	8	–	6	.571	14	–	12	.538
Oregon State	7	–	7	.500	16	–	10	.615
Washington State	6	–	8	.429	9	–	17	.346
Washington	5	–	9	.357	9	–	16	.360
California	4	–	10	.286	8	–	15	.348
Oregon	3	–	11	.214	9	–	17	.346
As of November 25, 2011; Rankings from AP Poll

The 1964–65 Washington Huskies men's basketball team represented the University of Washington for the 1964–65 NCAA University Division basketball season. Led by second-year head coach Mac Duckworth, the Huskies were members of the Athletic Association of Western Universities (Pacific-8) and played their home games on campus at Hec Edmundson Pavilion in Seattle, Washington.

The Huskies were 9–16 overall in the regular season and 5–9 in conference play, sixth in the standings.
