= Doug McIntosh =

American former basketball player

Personal information
- Born: February 20, 1945 Oneida, Kentucky, U.S.
- Died: April 9, 2021 (aged 76)
- Listed height: 6 ft 7 in (2.01 m)

Career information
- High school: Lily (Lily, Kentucky)
- College: UCLA (1963–1966)
- NBA draft: 1966: undrafted
- Position: Power forward / center

Career highlights
- 2× NCAA champion (1964, 1965)

Paul Douglas McIntosh (February 20, 1945 – April 9, 2021) was an American college basketball player for the UCLA Bruins. He won two national championships with the Bruins. He later became a pastor.

== Basketball career ==
McIntosh, a center from Lily High School in Lily, Kentucky, was originally planning to play college ball for Tennessee, but their coach lost his job, and the school's interest waned. McIntosh instead attended the University of California at Los Angeles, and played for the Bruins under future Hall of Fame coach John Wooden. He was a key reserve for the Bruins as they won their first national title in 1964, playing around 30 minutes in the championship game against Duke and grabbing 11 rebounds. He filled in for starter Fred Slaughter, who barely played after being injured on the game's opening tip.

McIntosh became a starter as a junior in 1964–65, replacing the departed senior Slaughter, and UCLA repeated as national champions. In the championship game against Michigan, Wooden opted to play sophomore reserve Mike Lynn over McIntosh for most of the game, much like he had favored McIntosh over Slaughter a year earlier. After the game, McIntosh expressed agreement with his coach's substitution. As a senior, McIntosh appeared on the cover of Sports Illustrated's issue previewing the upcoming college season. For his Bruin career, McIntosh scored 543 points (6.4 per game) and 486 rebounds (5.7 per game).

Years later, Wooden said that McIntosh was one of the two players in his coaching tenure who came closest to fulfilling their potential. After seeing him as a freshman, Wooden did not believe that McIntosh would ever play much with the school's varsity. However, he was surprised that the center became a significant contributor and eventual starter. Wooden was as proud of McIntosh as any player that he ever coached.

== Later years ==
After college, McIntosh was not selected in the 1966 NBA draft. He attended seminary at Dallas Theological Seminary and later co-founded the Cornerstone Bible Church in Lilburn, Georgia.

McIntosh died on April 9, 2021, after a long illness.
