= John Wooden =

American basketball coach (1910–2010)

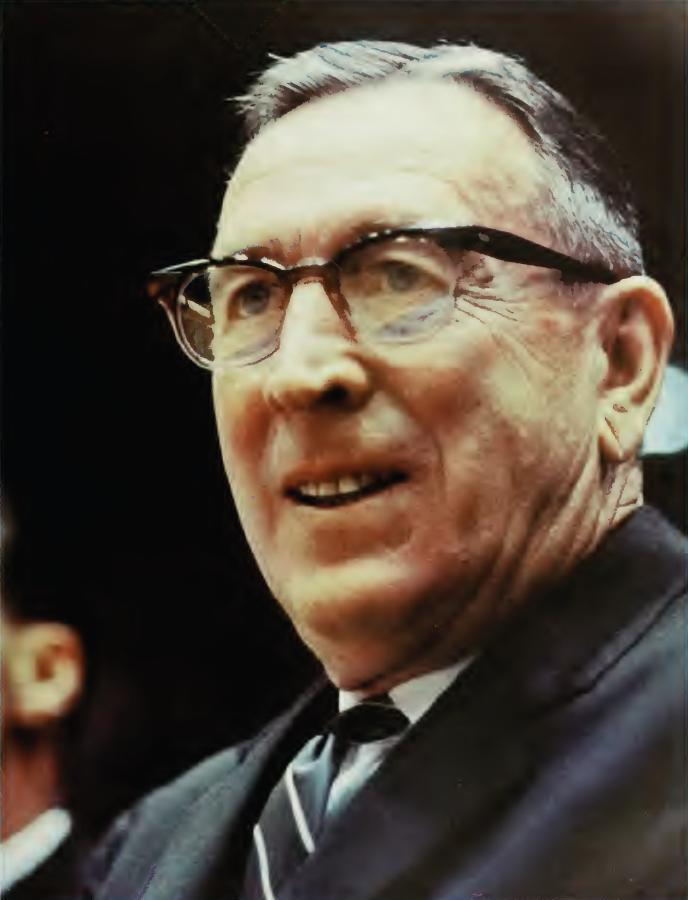
- Wooden, c. 1972

Biographical details
- Born: October 14, 1910; Hall, Indiana, U.S.
- Died: June 4, 2010 (aged 99); Los Angeles, California, U.S.

Playing career

Basketball
- 1929–1932: Purdue
- 1932–1937: Indianapolis Kautskys
- 1937–1938: Whiting / Hammond Ciesar All-Americans
- 1938–1939: Indianapolis Kautskys
- Position: Guard

Coaching career (HC unless noted)

Basketball
- 1933–1935: Dayton HS
- 1935–1944: South Bend Central HS
- 1946–1948: Indiana State
- 1948–1975: UCLA

Baseball
- 1948: Indiana State

Administrative career (AD unless noted)
- 1946–1948: Indiana State

Head coaching record
- Overall: 664–162 (college basketball); 7–7 (college baseball)

Accomplishments and honors

Championships
- As player: Helms national championship (1932); As head coach: 10 NCAA tournament (1964, 1965, 1967–1973, 1975); 12 NCAA regional—Final Four (1962, 1964, 1965, 1967–1975); 3 PCC tournament (1953–1955); 15 PCC / AAWU / Pac-8 regular season (1950, 1952, 1956, 1962–1965, 1967–1975)

Awards
- As player: All-NBL First Team (1938); NBL scoring leader (1933); 3× Consensus All-American (1930–1932); Helms Player of the Year (1932); Big Ten Medal of Honor (1932); As coach: The Sporting News Sportsman of the Year (1970); Sports Illustrated Sportsman of the Year (1972); 5x AP College Coach of the Year (1967, 1969, 1970, 1972, 1973) 7x Henry Iba Award (1964, 1967, 1969–1973) 5x NABC Coach of the Year (1964, 1967, 1969, 1970, 1972) 6x UPI College Coach of the Year (1964, 1967, 1969, 1970, 1972, 1973) 4x Sporting News College Coach of the Year (1964, 1969, 1972, 1973); Presidential Medal of Freedom (2003); Theodore Roosevelt Award (1996); Indiana Sports Hall of Fame (2020)
- Basketball Hall of Fame; Inducted in 1960 (as a player) 1973 (as a coach)
- College Basketball Hall of Fame; Inducted in 2006
- Military career
- Allegiance: United States
- Branch: US Navy
- Service years: 1942–1946
- Rank: Lieutenant
- Conflicts: World War II

John Robert Wooden (October 14, 1910 – June 4, 2010) was an American basketball coach and player. Nicknamed "the Wizard of Westwood", he won ten National Collegiate Athletic Association (NCAA) national championships in a 12-year period as head coach for the UCLA Bruins, including a record seven in a row. No other team has won more than four in a row in Division I college men's or women's basketball. Within this period, his teams won an NCAA men's basketball record 88 consecutive games. Wooden won the prestigious Henry Iba Award as national coach of the year a record seven times and won the Associated Press award five times.

As a 5-foot-10-inch (1.78 m) guard with the Purdue Boilermakers, Wooden was the first college basketball player to be named an All-American three times, and the 1932 Purdue team on which he played as a senior was retroactively recognized as the pre-NCAA tournament national champion by the Helms Athletic Foundation and was retroactively listed as the top-ranked team by the Premo-Porretta Power Poll. He played professionally in the National Basketball League (NBL). Wooden was inducted into the Naismith Memorial Basketball Hall of Fame as a player (1960) and as a coach (1973), the first person to be enshrined in both categories. (Note: Lenny Wilkens, Bill Sharman, Tommy Heinsohn, and Bill Russell are the only other basketball players who have since achieved the same honors.)

One of the most respected coaches in the history of sports, Wooden was admired by many of his former players, including Lew Alcindor (later Kareem Abdul-Jabbar) and Bill Walton. He was known for delivering short, simple motivational messages to his players, including his concept of the "Pyramid of Success", which emphasized success in life as well as in basketball. Wooden's 29-year coaching career and reputation for leadership contributed to a legacy that extended beyond sports into fields such as business, personal development, and organizational leadership.

== Early life and playing career ==
John Robert Wooden was born on October 14, 1910, in Hall, Indiana, the son of Roxie (1887–1959) and Joshua Wooden (1882–1950), and moved with his family to a small farm in Centerton in 1918. He had three brothers: Maurice, Daniel, and William, and two sisters, one (unnamed) who died in infancy, and another, Harriet Cordelia, who died from diphtheria at the age of two.

When he was a boy, Wooden's role model was Fuzzy Vandivier of the Franklin Wonder Five, a team that dominated Indiana high school basketball from 1919 to 1922. After his family moved to the town of Martinsville when he was 14, Wooden led his high school team to a state tournament title in 1927. He was a three-time All-State selection.

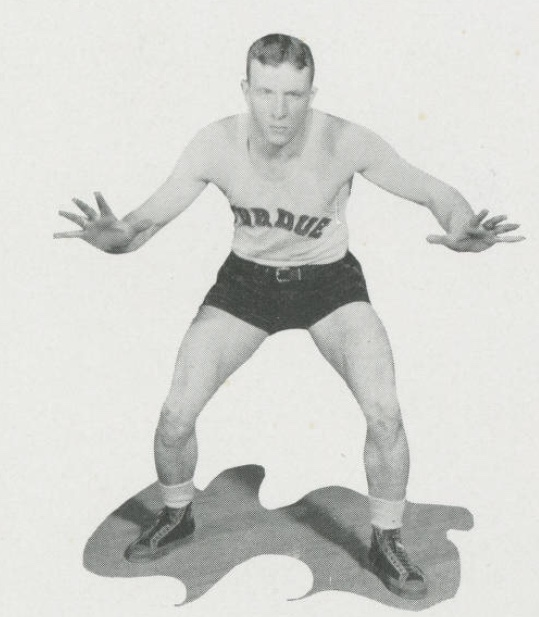
Wooden at Purdue

After graduating from high school in 1928, he attended Purdue University and was coached by Ward "Piggy" Lambert. The 1932 Purdue team on which he played as a senior was retroactively recognized as the pre-NCAA tournament national champion by the Helms Athletic Foundation and was retroactively listed as the top-ranked team by the Premo-Poretta Power Poll. John Wooden was named All-Big Ten and All-Midwestern (1930–32) while at Purdue, and he was the first player ever to be named a three-time consensus All-American. In 1932, he was awarded the Big Ten Medal of Honor, recognizing one student athlete from the graduating class of each Big Ten member school, for demonstrating joint athletic and academic excellence throughout their college career. He was also selected for membership in the Beta Theta Pi fraternity. Wooden is also an honorary member of Alpha Phi Omega National Service Fraternity. Wooden was nicknamed "The Indiana Rubber Man" for his suicidal dives on the hardcourt. He graduated from Purdue in 1932 with a degree in English.

After college, Wooden spent several years playing professional basketball in the NBL with the Indianapolis Kautskys, Whiting Ciesar All-Americans, and Hammond Ciesar All-Americans, while he taught and coached in the high school ranks. During one 46-game stretch, he made 134 consecutive free throws, which is still a professional record to this day (the NBA record is 97 made by Micheal Williams in 1993). One notable instance made after hitting his 100th consecutive free throw had Kautskys owner Frank Kautsky pay $100 to Wooden directly during a game. He was named to the All-NBL First Team for the 1937–38 season.

During World War II in 1942, he joined the United States Navy. He served until 1946 and left the service as a lieutenant.

== Coaching career ==
=== High school ===
The plaque in the Dayton (KY) High School gymnasium

Wooden coached two years at Dayton High School in Dayton, Kentucky. His first year at Dayton, the 1932–33 season, marked the only time he had a losing record (6–11) as a coach. After Dayton, he returned to Indiana, where he taught English, coached basketball and served as the athletic director at South Bend Central High School until entering the Armed Forces. Wooden spent two years at Dayton and nine years at Central. His high school coaching record over 11 years was 218–42.

=== Indiana State University ===
After World War II, Wooden coached at Indiana State Teachers College, later renamed Indiana State University, in Terre Haute, Indiana, from 1946 to 1948, succeeding his high school coach, Glenn M. Curtis. In addition to his duties as basketball coach, Wooden also coached baseball (1948 season, 7–7 record) and served as athletic director, all while teaching and completing his master's degree in education. In 1947, Wooden's basketball team won the Indiana Intercollegiate Conference title and received an invitation to the National Association of Intercollegiate Basketball (NAIB) National Tournament in Kansas City. Wooden refused the invitation, citing the NAIB's policy banning black players. One of Wooden's players, Clarence Walker, was a black man from East Chicago, Indiana.

That same year, Wooden's alma mater Purdue University asked him to return to campus and serve as an assistant to then-head coach Mel Taube until Taube's contract expired, when Wooden would take over the program. Citing his loyalty to Taube, Wooden declined the offer, because this would have effectively made Taube a lame-duck coach.

In 1948, Wooden again led Indiana State to the conference title. The NAIB had reversed its policy banning black players that year, and Wooden coached his team to the NAIB National Tournament final, losing to Louisville. This was the only championship game a Wooden-coached team ever lost. That year, Walker became the first black player to play in any post-season intercollegiate basketball tournament.

=== UCLA ===
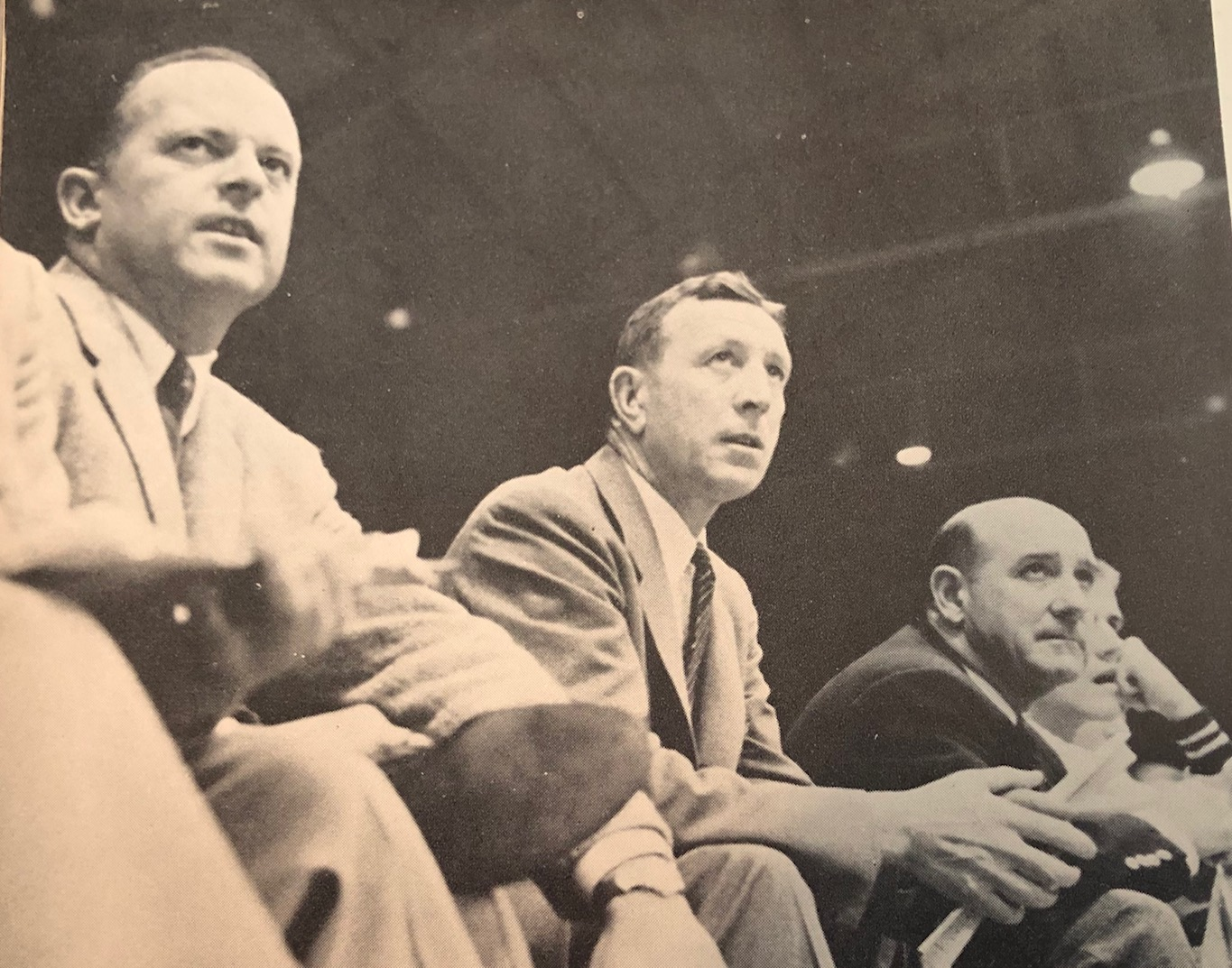
Wooden with assistant coach Bill Putnam and trainer Ducky Drake, c. 1958

In the 1948–1949 season, Wooden was hired by the University of California, Los Angeles, to be the fourth basketball coach in the school's history. He succeeded Fred Cozens, Caddy Works, and Wilbur Johns; Johns became the school's athletic director. Wooden signed a three-year contract for $6,000 in the first year. Prior to being hired at UCLA, he had been pursued for the head coaching position at the University of Minnesota, and it was his and his wife's desire to remain in the Midwest, but inclement weather in Minnesota prevented Wooden from receiving the scheduled phone offer from the Golden Gophers. Thinking that they had lost interest, Wooden instead accepted the head coaching job with the Bruins. Officials from the University of Minnesota contacted Wooden immediately after he accepted the position at UCLA, but he declined their offer because he had already given his word to UCLA.

Wooden had immediate success, fashioning the mark of the rarest of coaches, an "instant turnaround" for an undistinguished, faltering program. Part of this success was due to his unique offensive system, the same system that countless coaches use today. John Wooden stated, "I believe my system is perfectly suited to counter all the modern defenses I have seen, and that includes run-and-jump, 1–3–1 trapping, box-and-one, triangle-and-two, and switching man-to-man."

Prior to Wooden's arrival at UCLA, the basketball program had only had two conference championship seasons in the previous 18 years. In his first season, he took a Bruins team that had posted a 12–13 record the previous year and transformed it into a Pacific Coast Conference (PCC) Southern Division champion with a 22–7 record, the most wins in a season for UCLA since the school started playing basketball in 1919. He surpassed that number the next season with 24–7 and a second division title and overall conference title in 1950, and would add two more in his first four years. Up to that time, UCLA had collected a total of two division titles since the PCC began divisional play, and had not won a conference title of any sort since winning the Southern California Intercollegiate Athletic Conference in 1927.

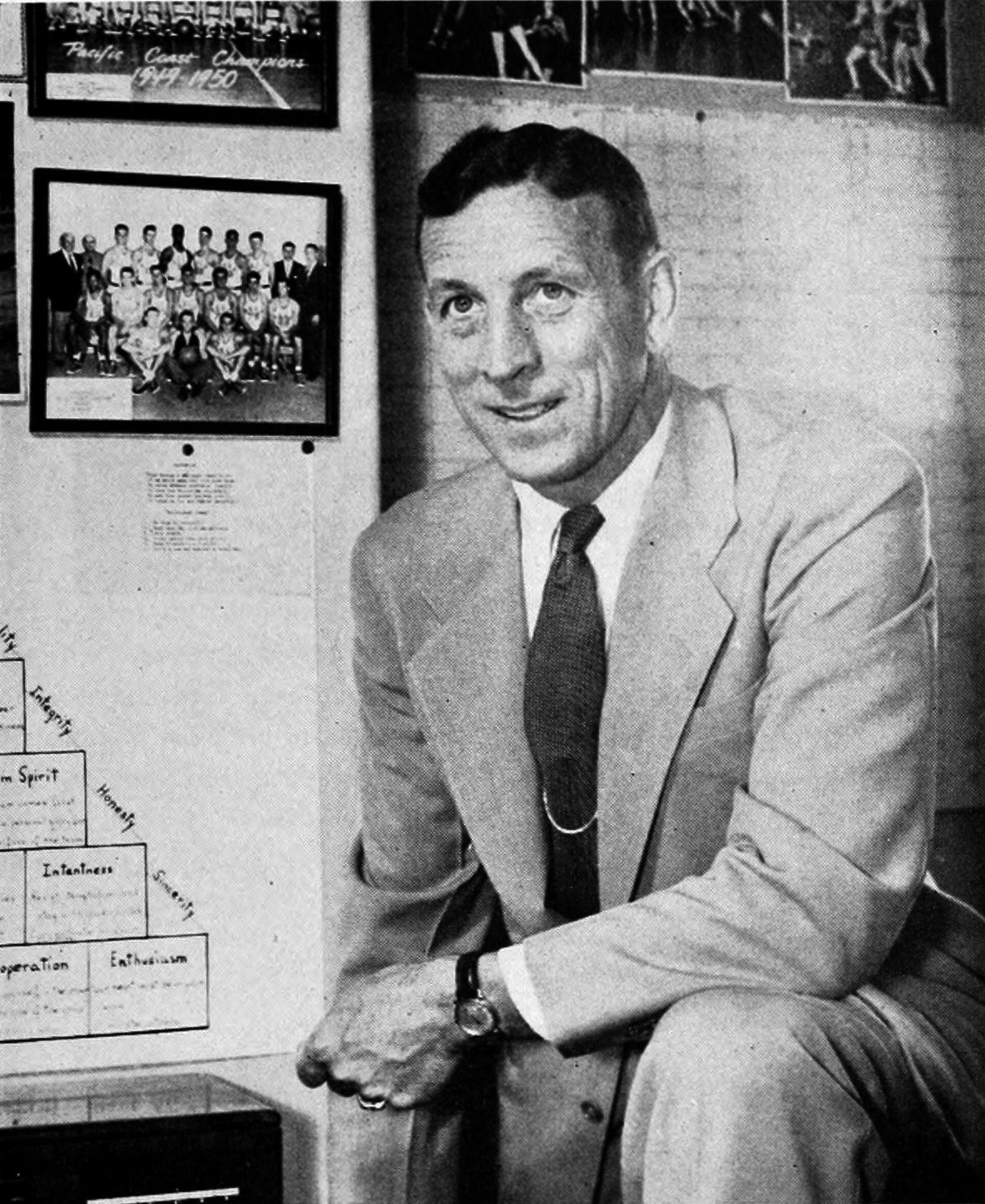
Wooden in 1960

In spite of these achievements, Wooden reportedly did not initially enjoy his position, and his wife did not favor living in Los Angeles. When Mel Taube left Purdue in 1950, Wooden's inclination was to return to West Lafayette and finally accept the head coaching job there. He was ultimately dissuaded when UCLA officials reminded him that it was he who had insisted upon a three-year commitment during negotiations in 1948. Wooden felt that leaving UCLA prior to the expiration of his contract would be tantamount to breaking his word, even though Purdue offered more money, a car and housing.

By the 1955–56 season, Wooden had established a record of sustained success at UCLA. That year, he guided the team to its first undefeated PCC conference title and a 17-game winning streak that came to an end only at the hands of Phil Woolpert's University of San Francisco team (who had Bill Russell and K.C. Jones) that eventually won the 1956 NCAA tournament. However, UCLA was unable to advance from this level over the immediately ensuing seasons, finding itself unable to return to the NCAA Tournament, as the Pete Newell-coached teams of the California Golden Bears took control of the conference and won the 1959 NCAA tournament. Also hampering the fortunes of Wooden's team during that time period was a probation that was imposed on all UCLA sports teams in the aftermath of a scandal that involved illegal payments made to players on the school's football team. The probation was also extended to three additional schools: the University of Southern California, California and Stanford. The scandal resulted in the dismantling of the PCC conference.

By the 1961–1962 season, the probation was no longer in place and Wooden returned his team to the top of the conference. This time, however, they would take the next step, and in so doing, unleash a run of dominance unparalleled in the history of college basketball. UCLA reached the Final Four of the NCAA tournament for the first time in school history. A narrow loss, due largely to a controversial foul call in a 1962 semi-final game against Ed Jucker's eventual national champion Cincinnati team, convinced Wooden that his Bruins were ready to contend for national championships. Two seasons later in 1964, the final piece of the puzzle fell into place when assistant coach Jerry Norman persuaded Wooden that the team's small-sized players and fast-paced offense would be complemented by the adoption of a zone press defense, which increased the probability of turnovers by the opposing team. The result was a dramatic increase in scoring, giving UCLA a powerhouse team that went 30–0 on its way to the school's first basketball national championship and first undefeated season as the Bruins beat Vic Bubas' taller and slower racially segregated Duke team 98–83 in the final. Walt Hazzard fouled out of the game late in the second half on a player control foul, but this proved to be insignificant when he cut down the net in celebration and was named tournament most valuable player. Gail Goodrich (27 points), Keith Erickson, Fred Slaughter, Jack Hirsch, and reserve Kenny Washington (26 points, 12 rebounds) contributed to the UCLA win. With no player taller than 6 feet, 5 inches, the Bruins' speed and zone press forced 29 turnovers and nullified the height advantage of Duke's Hack Tison and Jay Buckley, two 6-foot, 10-inch players.

In the 1964–1965 campaign, the defending NCAA champions got off to an ominous start when UCLA lost to Illinois by 27 points in its opening game. It was all uphill after that as the squad repeated as national champions with Gail Goodrich, Kenny Washington, and Doug McIntosh. The Bruins upended Dave Strack's Michigan team 91–80 in the finals of the NCAA tournament. Goodrich shared Player of the Year honors with Princeton's Bill Bradley. The 1966 squad was denied a chance at a triple crown when it finished second to Oregon State in the Athletic Association of Western Universities (now the Pac-12). UCLA was ineligible to play in the NCAA tournament that year because in those days only conference champions received a bid to the tournament. The Bruins' 1967 incarnation returned with a vengeance with sophomore star Alcindor, reclaiming not only the conference title, but the national crown with another 30–0 season, and then retaining it every season but one until Wooden's retirement immediately following the 1975 NCAA championship.

The resurgence of the Bruins under Wooden made it obvious that they needed a new home. Since 1932, the Bruins had played at the Men's Gym. It normally seated 2,400, but had been limited to 1,500 since 1955 by order of the city fire marshal. This forced the Bruins to move games to Pan Pacific Auditorium, the Los Angeles Memorial Sports Arena and other venues around Los Angeles when they were expected to attract larger crowds—something that happened fairly often after the Bruins' first national title. At Wooden's urging, a much larger on-campus facility, Pauley Pavilion, was built in time for the 1965–66 season. The building in Westwood was christened on November 27, 1965, in a special game that pitted the UCLA varsity against the UCLA freshmen. It was Lew Alcindor's (later Kareem Abdul-Jabbar) freshman season (freshmen were ineligible to play on the varsity in those days). UCLA was the defending national champion and ranked number 1 in the pre-season poll. The freshmen easily won the game by a score of 75–60. It was a powerful indication of things to come.

A rule change was instituted for the 1967–1968 season, primarily because of Alcindor's towering play near the basket. The dunk shot was outlawed and would not be reinstated until the 1976–1977 season, which was shortly after Wooden's retirement. This was at least the second time that the rules committee had initiated change in response to the domination of a superstar player; in 1944, the goaltending rule was instituted to counter George Mikan's dominant defensive play near the basket. In January, UCLA took its 47-game winning streak to the Astrodome in Houston, where the Bruins met Guy Lewis' Houston squad, who had Elvin Hayes, Don Chaney, and Ken Spain, in the Game of the Century in the nation's first nationally televised regular season college basketball game. Houston upset UCLA 71–69, as Hayes scored 39 points. In a post-game interview, Wooden said, "We have to start over." UCLA went undefeated the rest of the year and thrashed Houston 101–69 in the semi-final rematch of the NCAA tournament en route to the national championship. Sports Illustrated ran the front cover headline Lew's Revenge. The rout of Houston. UCLA limited Hayes to only 10 points; he had been averaging 37.7 points per game. Wooden credited Norman for devising the diamond-and-one defense that contained Hayes. The Game of the Century is also remembered for an incident involving Wooden and Edgar Lacy. Lacy was ineffective on defense against Elvin Hayes, and Wooden benched him after 11 minutes. Lacy never re-entered the game. Furious with Wooden, Lacy quit the team three days later, telling the Los Angeles Times "I've never enjoyed playing for that man." UCLA's talent during the 1968 NCAA tournament was so overwhelming that they placed four players on the All-Tournament team. In addition to Alcindor, Lucius Allen, Mike Warren, and "Lefty" Lynn Shackelford were given accolades. Kenny Heitz was also a member of UCLA's 1968 team.

Lew Alcindor finished his career at UCLA in 1969 with a third consecutive national championship when the Bruins beat George King's Purdue team 92–72 in the title game. The three straight titles were matched by three consecutive MVP awards in the tournament as Alcindor established himself as college basketball's superstar during the three-peat performance. Alcindor and Wooden would continue their communication even after he left UCLA. In 2017, Jabbar wrote a book, "Coach Wooden and Me", which details their long-standing friendship.

A sportswriter commented that everybody outside of UCLA would be happy that glorious day in June when Alcindor finally graduated and college basketball could go back to the routine method of determining a national champion. This prophecy would prove to be ludicrous over the next six years. The 1970 squad proved that nobody was indispensable to the success of the UCLA program, not even Alcindor, as Sidney Wicks, Henry Bibby, Curtis Rowe, John Vallely, and Kenny Booker carried the Bruins to their fourth consecutive NCAA title with an 80–69 win over upstart Jacksonville, coached by Joe Williams. Wicks and Rowe double teamed 7-foot Artis Gilmore on defense and shut down the high-powered Jacksonville offense, which had been averaging 100 points per game. Gilmore and 5'10" Rex Morgan had been dubbed "Batman and Robin" by the press.

In the 1971 NCAA championship game, Steve Patterson outscored Howard Porter of Jack Kraft's scandal-plagued Villanova squad as UCLA won 68–62. The following year, UCLA had its closest game in all of Wooden's 10 championships, beating Hugh Durham's Florida State team 81–76 to take the 1972 title. After the game, Bill Walton said, "We didn't play well."

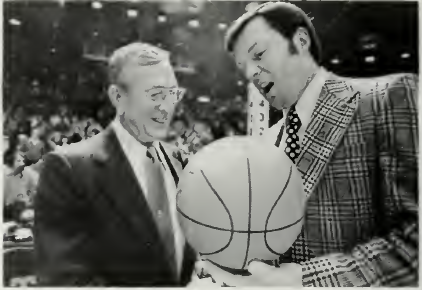
Wooden with Digger Phelps in 1973, after UCLA beat Notre Dame for their NCAA-record 61st straight win

The 1972–1973 season was one of the most memorable campaigns in the history of UCLA basketball. Freshmen became eligible to play varsity ball again, and the Bruins went 30–0 and stretched their winning streak to a record 75 straight in breezing through the NCAA tournament by blowing out Gene Bartow's Memphis State team 87–66 in the final, as Bill Walton hit an incredible 21 of 22 field goal attempts. Walton and Wooden were everybody's Player and Coach of the Year again. Keith Wilkes, Greg Lee, and Larry Hollyfield were members of that team, and Wilkes would go on to win four NBA championships as well.

UCLA's two big streaks came to an end during the 1973–1974 season. In January, the winning streak stopped at 88 games when Digger Phelps's Notre Dame squad upended the Bruins 71–70 in South Bend. Two months later, Norm Sloan's North Carolina State team defeated UCLA 80–77 in double overtime in the semifinals of the NCAA tournament. David Thompson was NC State's All-American, and Tom Burleson did an excellent job on defense against Bill Walton. UCLA had beaten the Wolfpack by 18 points early in the season, but things were different when they met in March.

Wooden coached his final game in Pauley Pavilion on March 1, 1975, a 93–59 victory over Stanford. Four weeks later, following a 75–74 overtime victory over former player and former assistant coach Denny Crum and Louisville in the 1975 NCAA Tournament semifinal game, Wooden announced that he would retire at age 64 immediately after the championship game. His coaching career concluded triumphantly when Richard Washington and David Meyers combined for 52 points as UCLA responded with a 92–85 win over Joe B. Hall and Kentucky to claim Wooden's first career coaching victory over the Wildcats and his unprecedented 10th national championship. Marques Johnson and Andre McCarter were also key contributors on Wooden's final championship team.

Andy Hill, who was on three Bruin teams under Wooden that won NCAA championships from 1970 to 1972, decades later co-wrote with Wooden the 2001 book Be Quick—But Don't Hurry! Finding Success in the Teachings of a Lifetime. The bestseller details how Hill applied his experience as a player under Wooden to achieve success in his career as a television executive. His goal was to demonstrate the relevance of Wooden's coaching style to the business world. The book also delves into his personal relationship with Wooden as his coach and mentor.

In 2004, a 93-year-old Wooden stated that he would not mind coming back as an assistant who could help players with practices and other light duties.

During his tenure with the Bruins, Wooden became known as "the Wizard of Westwood", though he personally disdained the nickname. He gained lasting fame with UCLA by winning 620 games in 27 seasons and 10 NCAA titles during his last 12 seasons, including seven in a row from 1967 to 1973. His UCLA teams also established an NCAA men's basketball record winning streak of 88 games and four perfect 30–0 seasons. They also won 38 straight games in NCAA tournaments and 98 straight home wins at Pauley Pavilion, where Wooden compiled a 149–2 record over 10 seasons.

"He never made more than $35,000 a year salary (not including camps and speaking engagements), including 1975, the year he won his 10th national championship, and never asked for a raise", wrote Rick Reilly of ESPN. He was given a Bruin powder blue Mercedes that season as a retirement gift. According to his own writings, Wooden turned down an offer to coach the Los Angeles Lakers from owner Jack Kent Cooke that may have been ten times what UCLA was paying him.

=== Association with Sam Gilbert ===
During Wooden's time at UCLA, and after his retirement in 1975, he faced criticism for the program's relationship with local businessman and booster Sam Gilbert, known by many of Wooden's players as "Papa Sam." Gilbert, a multi-millionaire contractor, was known for forging close financial relationships with UCLA players, supplying them with cars, clothes, stereos, travel, and apartments, as well as allegedly arranging abortions for players' girlfriends. He represented several UCLA stars, including Lew Alcindor and Bill Walton, as an agent after they turned pro.

A 1981 Los Angeles Times investigation, interviewing 45 people affiliated with the basketball program, revealed the extent of Gilbert's involvement, describing him as "a one-man clearinghouse who has enabled players and their families to receive goods and services usually at big discounts and sometimes free." The Times investigation found that Gilbert's involvement in the program began in 1967, when UCLA stars Alcindor and Lucius Allen were considering transferring to Michigan State. They approached former UCLA star Willie Naulls, who introduced them to Gilbert. Gilbert met with the two players, and both remained at UCLA. Alcindor, later Kareem Abdul-Jabbar, said later that he would have stayed regardless but called Gilbert "like my surrogate father." Allen credited Gilbert with dissuading him from transferring: "There were two people I listened to. Coach Wooden as long as we were between the lines. Outside the court — Sam Gilbert." Allen said Gilbert paid for multiple abortions for players' girlfriends, including one of his own. "Everybody knew what was going on," UCLA player David Greenwood said. "Nobody was so naive. It was common knowledge in the whole town."

UCLA assistant Jerry Norman, who coached under Wooden from 1957 to 1968, recalled that Gilbert began "to come around our program right when I was ready to leave. What normally happens is, alumni come to you and say, 'Coach, is there any way I can help?' Well, maybe. A lot of kids want summer jobs. But Gilbert started going behind the coaches. Alcindor calls me one day in the spring. I ask him, 'Where are you?' and he says, 'I'm in Mr. Gilbert's office.'" In his autobiography Giant Steps, Abdul-Jabbar called Gilbert "that odd combination, a cagey humanitarian with a lot of muscle. Guys would go to him when they were in trouble, and he would find a way to fix it...Sam steered clear of John Wooden, and Mr. Wooden gave him the same wide berth. Both helped the school greatly...once the money thing got worked out, I never gave another thought to leaving UCLA."

"The way Sam explained it to me, it was within the rules," Allen said in a 2007 documentary. "But it wasn't." In 1973, freshman center Richard Washington told The New York Times the reason he'd chosen UCLA: "I took a dip in Sam Gilbert's pool and it cooled me off and that was the convincer."

In 1978, NCAA field investigator J. Brent Clark testified before a Congressional subcommittee that he had begun investigating Gilbert's activities the year before but was told to back off by a superior at the NCAA, Bill Hunt. "If I had spent a month in Los Angeles, I could have put them [UCLA] on indefinite suspension," Clark said later, but "as long as Wooden was there, the NCAA would never have taken any action." Clark told Congress: "The conclusion I draw is that it is an example of a school that is too big, too powerful, and too well respected by the public, that the timing was not right to proceed against them.

Wooden was aware of Gilbert's closeness with his players. In 1972, Wooden said "I personally hardly know Sam Gilbert...I think he's a person who's trying to be helpful in every way that he can. I sometimes feel that in his interest to be helpful it's in direct contrast with what I would like to have him do to be helpful. I think he means very well and, for the most part, he has attached himself to the minority-race players. I really don't want to get involved in saying much about that, to be honest with you."

Despite concerns about Gilbert, Wooden said he chose not to ask players to cut off contact, telling the Times in 1981: "There's as much crookedness as you want to find. There was something Abraham Lincoln said — he'd rather trust and be disappointed than distrust and be miserable all the time. Maybe I trusted too much." The Times reporters, Mike Littwin and Alan Greenberg, concluded: "Wooden knew about Gilbert. He knew the players were close to Gilbert. He knew they looked to Gilbert for advice. Maybe he knew more. He should have known much more. If he didn't, it was only because he apparently chose not to look."

Wooden did pass along his concerns to UCLA athletic director J. D. Morgan, but Morgan did not pursue the matter aggressively, in part because he believed Gilbert was connected to the Mafia. Former UCLA chancellor Charles E. Young recalled Morgan "saying to me in that deep voice of his, 'Chuck, you don't know about Sam Gilbert. Do you want to end up on a block of concrete at the bottom of the ocean?' J. D.'s view of him was that if you cross Sam, you're likely to be killed, literally."

Gene Bartow, who succeeded Wooden as UCLA coach, felt similarly. In 1991, he wrote a letter to an NCAA official thanking him for suppressing Brent Clark's investigation into Gilbert. "I want to say 'thank you' for possibly saving my life...I believe Sam Gilbert was Mafia-related and was capable of hurting people. I think, had the NCAA come in hard while I was at UCLA, Gilbert and others associated with the program would have felt I had reported them, and I would have been in possible danger...Without question, he put out some front-end money to recruits in a few cases, and I think that could have been proven."

In 1981, after Wooden's retirement, an NCAA investigation sanctioned UCLA for its relationship with Gilbert, putting the program on probation for two seasons and ordering the school to disassociate itself from him. Three players at other universities told NCAA investigators that Gilbert had offered them cars to commit to UCLA.

In 1987, Gilbert was indicted in Florida for conspiracy, racketeering, and money laundering as part of a drug smuggling scheme, but he died of heart failure before he could be prosecuted. His son, Michael Gilbert, was convicted on four counts in the case. Trial testimony revealed that Sam Gilbert had used Miami drug money to build The Bicycle Hotel & Casino in Bell Gardens, California.

== Career playing statistics ==
=== NBL ===
Legend
| GP | Games played | FGM | Field goals made |
| FTM | Free throws made | FTA | Free throws attempted |
| FT% | Free throw percentage | PTS | Total points |
| PPG | Points per game | **Bold** | Career high |

==== Regular season ====
| Year | Team | GP | FGM | FTM | PTS | PPG |
|---|---|---|---|---|---|---|
| 1937–38 | Whiting | **13** | **52** | **39** | **143** | **11.0** |
| 1938–39 | Indianapolis | 5 | 14 | 11 | 39 | 7.8 |
| 1938–39 | Hammond | 5 | 10 | 12 | 32 | 6.4 |
| Career | | 23 | 76 | 62 | 214 | 9.3 |

==== Playoffs ====
| Year | Team | GP | FGM | FTM | PTS | PPG |
|---|---|---|---|---|---|---|
| 1938 | Whiting | 2 | 8 | 17 | 33 | 16.5 |

== Head coaching record ==
=== College basketball ===
Record table
| Season | Team | Overall | Conference | Standing | Postseason |
|---|---|---|---|---|---|
**Indiana State Sycamores** (Indiana Intercollegiate Conference) (1946–1948)
| 1946–47 | Indiana State | 17–8 | 5–2 | 1st | NAIA invitation declined |
| 1947–48 | Indiana State | 27–7 | 7–0 | 1st | NAIA Runner-up |
| Indiana State: | | 44–15 (.746) | 12–2 (.857) | | |
**UCLA Bruins** (Pacific Coast Conference) (1948–1959)
| 1948–49 | UCLA | 22–7 | 10–2 | 1st (South) | |
| 1949–50 | UCLA | 24–7 | 10–2 | 1st | NCAA Regional Fourth Place |
| 1950–51 | UCLA | 19–10 | 9–4 | T–1st (South) | |
| 1951–52 | UCLA | 19–12 | 8–4 | 1st (South) | NCAA Regional Fourth Place |
| 1952–53 | UCLA | 16–8 | 6–6 | 3rd (South) | |
| 1953–54 | UCLA | 18–7 | 7–5 | 2nd (South) | |
| 1954–55 | UCLA | 21–5 | 11–1 | 1st (South) | |
| 1955–56 | UCLA | 22–6 | 16–0 | 1st | NCAA Regional Third Place |
| 1956–57 | UCLA | 22–4 | 13–3 | T–2nd | |
| 1957–58 | UCLA | 16–10 | 10–6 | 3rd | |
| 1958–59 | UCLA | 16–9 | 10–6 | T–3rd | |
**UCLA Bruins** (Pacific-8 Conference) (1959–1975)
| 1959–60 | UCLA | 14–12 | 7–5 | 2nd | |
| 1960–61 | UCLA | 18–8 | 7–5 | 2nd | |
| 1961–62 | UCLA | 18–11 | 10–2 | 1st | NCAA University Division Fourth Place |
| 1962–63 | UCLA | 20–9 | 8–5 | T–1st | NCAA University Division Regional Fourth Place |
| 1963–64 | UCLA | 30–0 | 15–0 | 1st | NCAA University Division Champion |
| 1964–65 | UCLA | 28–2 | 14–0 | 1st | NCAA University Division Champion |
| 1965–66 | UCLA | 18–8 | 10–4 | 2nd | |
| 1966–67 | UCLA | 30–0 | 14–0 | 1st | NCAA University Division Champion |
| 1967–68 | UCLA | 29–1 | 14–0 | 1st | NCAA University Division Champion |
| 1968–69 | UCLA | 29–1 | 13–1 | 1st | NCAA University Division Champion |
| 1969–70 | UCLA | 28–2 | 12–2 | 1st | NCAA University Division Champion |
| 1970–71 | UCLA | 29–1 | 14–0 | 1st | NCAA University Division Champion |
| 1971–72 | UCLA | 30–0 | 14–0 | 1st | NCAA University Division Champion |
| 1972–73 | UCLA | 30–0 | 14–0 | 1st | NCAA University Division Champion |
| 1973–74 | UCLA | 26–4 | 12–2 | 1st | NCAA Division I Third Place |
| 1974–75 | UCLA | 28–3 | 12–2 | 1st | NCAA Division I Champion |
| UCLA: | | 620–147 (.808) | 300–67 (.817) | | |
| Total: | | 664–162 (.804) | | | |
National champion Postseason invitational champion Conference regular season champion Conference regular season and conference tournament champion Division regular season champion Division regular season and conference tournament champion Conference tournament champion

== List of NCAA championships ==
| Year | Record | Final Opponent | Final score | Notes |
|---|---|---|---|---|
| 1964 | 30–0 | Duke | 98–83 | John Wooden won his first national title in his sixteenth season at UCLA. Senior Walt Hazzard starred for UCLA as the Bruins made a 16–0 run late in the first half to beat Duke and its All-American Jeff Mullins. |
| 1965 | 28–2 | Michigan | 91–80 | The Bruins were led by senior All-American guard Gail Goodrich and used an effective zone press. Goodrich scored 42 points in the final against Michigan and Cazzie Russell. |
| 1967 | 30–0 | Dayton | 79–64 | The Bruins started a junior and four sophomores, which included Lew Alcindor (later Kareem Abdul-Jabbar). UCLA defeated unranked Dayton and Don May in the title game. |
| 1968 | 29–1 | North Carolina | 78–55 | UCLA's 47-game winning streak ended on January 20 when the Bruins were defeated by Houston and All-American Elvin Hayes in the Astrodome 71–69 in front of the largest college basketball crowd in NCAA history (52,693). The showdown was the nation's first nationally televised regular season college basketball game. The game was known as the Game of the Century. Lew Alcindor was limited from having been hospitalized the week before with a scratched cornea. The Bruins, at full strength, avenged the loss in a rematch with Houston in the NCAA semi-finals, as they beat the Cougars 101–69. UCLA then defeated North Carolina in the title game to become the only team to win consecutive NCAA championships twice. |
| 1969 | 29–1 | Purdue | 92–72 | UCLA defeated Wooden's alma mater Purdue and its All-American Rick Mount in the championship game. UCLA became the only school to this day to win three consecutive NCAA basketball championships and Wooden became the first coach to win five NCAA championships. Lew Alcindor is the first player to win three national championships, as well as garner three consecutive MVP awards in the tournament. He finished his career at UCLA with an 88–2 record. |
| 1970 | 28–2 | Jacksonville | 80–69 | Despite the graduation of Alcindor, UCLA won its fourth championship in a row. The Bruins came back from a nine-point first half deficit as Sidney Wicks, Curtis Rowe, Henry Bibby, and the rest of the Bruins outlasted Artis Gilmore, Rex Morgan, Chip Dublin, and Pembrook Burrows of Jacksonville in the title game. |
| 1971 | 29–1 | Villanova | 68–62 | Senior Steve Patterson scored 29 points in the championship game against Villanova and Howard Porter as UCLA won its fifth in a row. In its regional final, UCLA overcame an 11-point deficit to defeat Long Beach State 57–55. Patterson's portrait was featured on the cover of Sports Illustrated with the headline "Unexpected Hero". |
| 1972 | 30–0 | Florida State | 81–76 | Sophomore Bill Walton led the Bruins to their sixth championship in a row. The Bruins had a rough time with Florida State and its great ball handler, Otto Petty, in the closest game of all their title wins, but their margin of victory in the NCAA tournament was a record 30.3 points. They became the first team to post three 30–0 seasons. John Wooden was selected by Sports Illustrated as its "Sportsman of the Year" for his contributions to college basketball. |
| 1973 | 30–0 | Memphis State | 87–66 | The Bruins became the only team in history with back-to-back undefeated seasons as they won their seventh straight championship. In the title game, junior Bill Walton hit 21 of 22 field goal attempts and scored 44 points in one of the greatest offensive performances in the history of the NCAA tournament. Memphis State coach Gene Bartow would replace Wooden at UCLA three years later. |
| 1975 | 28–3 | Kentucky | 92–85 | Coach Wooden ended his 27-year UCLA coaching career by winning his tenth national championship in 12 years. He announced his retirement at age 64 during the post-game press conference of the semi-final win against Louisville, and the UCLA players promptly responded by giving him a going away present with a win over Kentucky and its captain, Jimmy Dan Conner. For the Bruins, Richard Washington and Dave Meyers scored 28 and 24 points respectively to offset Kevin Grevey's game-high 34. |

== Legacy ==
When Wooden arrived at UCLA for the 1948–1949 season, he inherited a little-known program that played in a cramped gym. He left it as a national powerhouse with 10 national championships— the most successful rebuilding project in college basketball history. John Wooden ended his UCLA coaching career with a 620–147 overall record and a winning percentage of .808. These figures do not include his two-year record at Indiana State prior to taking over the duties at UCLA.

In 2009, Wooden was named The Sporting News "Greatest Coach of All Time".

== Honors ==
He received numerous national coaching honors throughout his career, earning seven USBWA Coach of the Year awards (1964, 1967, 1969–1973), six from UPI (1964, 1967, 1969, 1970, 1972, 1973), five from the AP (1967, 1969, 1970, 1972, 1973), five from the NABC (1964, 1967, 1969, 1970, 1972), and four from The Sporting News (1964, 1969, 1972, 1973). In 1970, he was named The Sporting News Sportsman of the Year. In 1972, he shared Sports Illustrated magazine's "Sportsman of the Year" award with Billie Jean King. In 1960, he was enshrined in the Basketball Hall of Fame for his achievements as a player and as a coach in 1973, becoming the first to be honored as both a player and a coach.

After his coaching career ended, UCLA continued to honor Wooden with the title of Head Men's Basketball Coach Emeritus. On November 17, 2006, Wooden was recognised for his impact on college basketball as a member of the founding class of the National Collegiate Basketball Hall of Fame. He was one of five people—along with Oscar Robertson, Bill Russell, Dean Smith and Dr. James Naismith—who were selected to represent the inaugural class. In 1991, he was inducted into the National High School Hall of Fame. In 2009, he was inducted into the Missouri Valley Conference Athletics Hall of Fame in St. Louis. Coach Wooden was the ninth honouree in the Missouri Valley Conference's Lifetime Achievement category. Wooden said the honour he was most proud of was "Outstanding Basketball Coach of the U.S". by his denomination, the Christian Church.

Since 1977, the John R. Wooden Award has been the most coveted of the four college basketball player-of-the-year awards. This award has attained the status of being the equivalent of football's Heisman Trophy for college basketball, with the winner announced during a ceremony held at the Los Angeles Athletic Club. The MVP award for the McDonald's All-American Game in high-school basketball is named the "John R. Wooden Most Valuable Player Award". The Wooden Legacy is held in his honour.

In 1998 the Coach Wooden "Keys to Life" Award was created to be given to a former player or coach who exemplifies character, leadership and faith. This Award is presented at the Legends of the Hardwood Breakfast, which is held each year at the Final Four and is hosted by Athletes in Action.

On February 3, 1984, Wooden was inducted into the Indiana State University Athletic Hall of Fame.

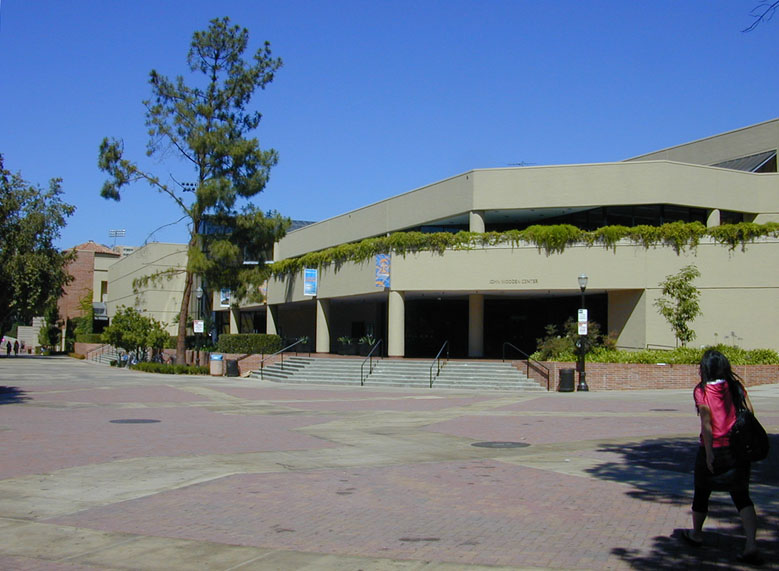
John Wooden Recreation Centre on the campus of UCLA

In 2000, Wooden was honored with the "Lombardi Award of Excellence" from the Vince Lombardi Cancer Foundation. The award was created to honor Coach Lombardi's legacy, and is awarded annually to an individual who exemplifies the spirit of the Coach.

Wooden has schools and athletic facilities named after him. The gym at his alma mater Martinsville High School bears his name, and in 2005 a high school in the Los Angeles Unified School District was renamed to John R. Wooden High School. In 2003, UCLA dedicated the basketball court in Pauley Pavilion in honor of John and Nell Wooden. Named the "Nell & John Wooden Court", Wooden asked for the change from the original proposal of the "John & Nell Wooden Court", insisting that his wife's name should come first. In 2008, Indiana State also bestowed this honour on Wooden by naming their home court in the Hulman Center the "Nellie and John Wooden Court". The student recreation centre at UCLA is also named in his honor. Also in 2008, Wooden was honoured with a commemorative bronze plaque in the Los Angeles Memorial Coliseum Memorial Court of Honor because his UCLA basketball teams played six seasons in the Los Angeles Memorial Sports Arena. On November 8, 2008, Indiana State officially named the floor at the Hulman Centre The Nellie and John Wooden Court in honor of the coach and his late wife, Nellie. The ceremony included taped comments from Coach Wooden and the participation of members of his 1946–47 and 1947–48 teams. The Sycamores christened the newly named floor by defeating the Albion College (MI) Britons in an exhibition game.

On July 23, 2003, John Wooden received the Presidential Medal of Freedom, the nation's highest civilian honor. It was presented by George W. Bush after a three-year campaign by Andre McCarter, who was on Wooden's 1975 National Championship team. The Ukleja Center for Ethical Leadership at California State University, Long Beach established the John Wooden Ethics in Leadership Award in 2009, with Wooden being the inaugural recipient. In 1986, John Wooden was honored as an Outstanding Alumnus of the School of Liberal Arts at Purdue University – the first year the award was given.

In 1976, Wooden received the Golden Plate Award of the American Academy of Achievement.

On May 17, 2004, Wooden was awarded the Ambassador Award of Excellence by the LA Sports & Entertainment Commission at the Riviera Country Club.

On Wooden's 96th birthday in 2006, a post office in Reseda, California, near where Wooden's daughter lives, was renamed the Coach John Wooden Post Office. This act was signed by President George W. Bush based on legislation introduced by Congressman Brad Sherman.

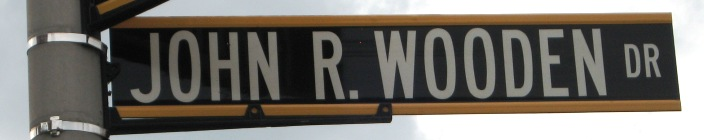

In July 2010, Wooden's alma mater, Purdue University, named a street on campus after him.

On October 14, 2010, the Undergraduate Student Association Council of UCLA held a "John Wooden Day Celebration" to honor Wooden's 100th birthday and to commemorate his contributions to the university. A portion of the UCLA Athletics Hall of Fame at Morgan Centre is a recreation of Wooden's den office in honor of his memory on campus.

Golf Digest lists Wooden as one of four people to score both a double eagle and a hole in one in the same round of golf. The feat was accomplished in 1947 at the South Bend Country Club in South Bend, Indiana.

The flagship leadership development program of Wooden's fraternity, Beta Theta Pi, is named "The John and Nellie Wooden Institute for Men of Principle" after Coach Wooden and his wife, Nellie. Coach Wooden's maxims and creed are central to the teaching of leadership development at the institute.

On October 26, 2012, a bronze statue of Wooden by sculptor Blair Buswell was dedicated at the newly renovated Pauley Pavilion.

Wooden's Legacy, a 2012 public artwork statue by Jeffrey Rouse, is exhibited in Indianapolis, Indiana.

The United States Postal Service honored Wooden as the subject of a first class forever postage stamp issued in February 2024. The unveiling was held at UCLA with former students such as Kareem Abdul-Jabar and Jamaal Wilkes reminiscing on Wooden's accomplishments.

== Following Wooden ==
Three of Wooden's former players would take over the program and leave within a few years. Gene Bartow, Gary Cunningham, Larry Brown, and Larry Farmer were the four coaches who entered and left UCLA in the nine years following Wooden. One former UCLA head coach, former ESPN analyst and former St. John's head coach Steve Lavin (fired from UCLA in 2003), has said "The mythology and pathology of UCLA basketball isn't going to change" due to Wooden's legacy and believes that every basketball coach will eventually be fired or forced out from UCLA.

Bartow, Wooden's immediate successor at UCLA, went 28–5 in 1976, but was blown out twice that season by Bob Knight's eventual undefeated national-champion Indiana Hoosiers, the second time in the Final Four, and lost 76–75 in the 1977 West Region semifinals to Idaho State. Bartow won 85.2% of his games (compared to Wooden's 80.8%) in two years, yet supposedly received death threats from unsatisfied UCLA fans.

Wooden himself often joked about being a victim of his own success, calling his successors on the phone and playfully identifying himself ominously as "we the alumni..." In his autobiography, Wooden recounts walking off the court in 1975 after his last game as a coach, having just won his tenth title, only to have a UCLA fan walk up and say, "Great win coach, this makes up for letting us down last year" (UCLA had lost in the semifinals in double overtime in 1974 to eventual national champion North Carolina State).

Bartow's successor, Wooden protege Gary Cunningham, posted an even better two-year record after Bartow, .862 (50–8) and No. 2 rankings each year, but could not proceed past two wins in the NCAAs, and left. Larry Brown came next, racking up more losses, 17, in two years than UCLA had experienced the previous four. With a near-magical end-of-season run typical of his career, he managed to coach UCLA into the title game in 1980, where the Bruins lost to Louisville, coached by Denny Crum. Coincidentally, Crum had played for Wooden at UCLA before working for him there as an assistant coach. Brown then left UCLA. Former UCLA players Larry Farmer and Walt Hazzard then took turns directing the UCLA program from 1981 to 1988. Hazzard's 1985 team won the National Invitation Tournament.

UCLA went 20 years after Wooden's retirement before winning another national championship, finally hanging a banner again in 1995 under coach Jim Harrick, when Ed O'Bannon starred for the Bruins as they beat Arkansas 89–78 in the title game and denied Nolan Richardson back-to-back titles. In 2006, Ben Howland led the team back to the national championship game for the first time since the 1995 title game, but they were defeated 73–57 by the Florida Gators and their star player Joakim Noah. Harrick was the only coach of John Wooden's nine successors who has guided the Bruins to an NCAA championship.

== Personal life ==
Wooden met his future wife, Nellie "Nell" Riley, when he was a freshman in high school They married in Indianapolis when they were both 21 years old. They had a son, James Hugh Wooden, and a daughter, Nancy Anne Muehlhausen. Nellie died on March 21, 1985 from cancer at age 73.

He was a devout Christian, considering his beliefs more important to him than basketball. Wooden's faith strongly influenced his life. He read the Bible daily and attended the First Christian Church.

In a 2009 interview he described himself politically as a "liberal", who had voted for some Republican presidential candidates.

== Final years and death ==
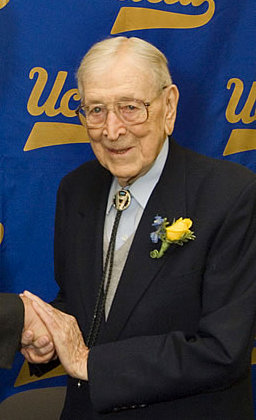
Wooden at a ceremony on his 96th birthday

Wooden was in good physical health until the later years of his life. On April 3, 2006, he spent three days in a Los Angeles hospital, receiving treatment for diverticulitis. He was hospitalized again in 2007 for bleeding in the colon, with his daughter quoted as saying her father was "doing well" upon his subsequent release. Wooden was hospitalized on March 1, 2008, after a fall in his home. He broke his left wrist and his collarbone in the fall, but remained in good condition according to his daughter and was given around-the-clock supervision. In February 2009, he was hospitalized for four weeks with pneumonia.

On May 26, 2010, Wooden was admitted to the Ronald Reagan UCLA Medical Center after suffering from dehydration. He remained hospitalized there and died of natural causes at age 99 on June 4, 2010. He was survived by his son, daughter, three grandsons, four granddaughters, and 13 great-grandchildren. Following a private ceremony, Wooden was interred with his wife Nellie in an outdoor community mausoleum at Forest Lawn Memorial Park in the Hollywood Hills neighborhood of Los Angeles. A public memorial service was held two weeks later at UCLA's Pauley Pavilion.

== Seven Point Creed ==
John Wooden's Seven Point Creed was given to him by his father Joshua upon his graduation from grammar school:

1. Be true to yourself.
2. Make each day your masterpiece.
3. Help others.
4. Drink deeply from good books, especially the Bible.
5. Make friendship a fine art.
6. Build a shelter against a rainy day.
7. Pray for guidance and give thanks for your blessings every day.

Wooden also lectured and authored a book about the Pyramid of Success. The Pyramid of Success consists of philosophical building blocks for succeeding at basketball and at life. In his later years he was hired by corporations to deliver inspirational lectures and even appeared in commercials for Hartford Insurance and the NCAA. Following his death in June 2010—shortly after the basketball season— all UCLA sports teams wore either a patch or helmet sticker with the initials "JRW" inside a black pyramid for the remainder of the season, in honor of his philosophy. Furthermore, the men's basketball team continues to wear the patch as of 2019, though not in black. It is generally known that he received lecture fees that exceeded the salaries he was paid as a coach. Wooden proudly claimed that these late in life windfalls allowed him to set up education accounts for all of his grandchildren. At the top of the Pyramid of Success was "Competitive Greatness" which Wooden defined as "Perform at your best when your best is required. Your best is required each day."

Wooden was also the author of several other books about basketball and life.

One of his maxims was "Be quick, but don't hurry".

== Publications ==
- John Wooden and Steve Jamison (2010) The Wisdom of Wooden: My Century On and Off the Court, McGraw-Hill Education. ISBN 978-0071751162
- John Wooden and Don Yaeger (2009) A Game Plan for Life: The Power of Mentoring, Bloomsbury USA. ISBN 978-1-59691-701-9
- John Wooden and Steve Jamison (2009) Coach Wooden's Leadership Game Plan for Success: 12 Lessons for Extraordinary Performance and Personal Excellence, McGraw-Hill Professional. ISBN 978-0-07-162614-9
- John Wooden and Steve Jamison (2007) The Essential Wooden: A Lifetime of Lessons on Leaders and Leadership, McGraw-Hill Education. ISBN 978-0-07-148435-0
- John Wooden with Swen Nater (2006) John Wooden's UCLA Offense, Human Kinetics. ISBN 978-0-7360-6180-3
- John Wooden and Steve Jamison (2005) Wooden on Leadership: How to Create a Winning Organization, McGraw-Hill Education. ISBN 978-0-07-145339-4
- John Wooden, Jay Carty (2005) Coach Wooden's Pyramid of Success Playbook, Revell. ISBN 978-0800726263
- John Wooden with Steve Jamison (2004) My Personal Best, McGraw-Hill Professional. ISBN 978-0-07-143792-9
- John Wooden, Jay Carty (2003) Coach Wooden One-on-One, Regal. ISBN 978-0830732913
- Andrew Hill with John Wooden (2001) Be Quick – But Don't Hurry: Finding Success in the Teachings of a Lifetime, Simon & Schuster ISBN 978-0743213882
- John Wooden with Steve Jamison (1997) Wooden: A Lifetime of Observations and Reflections On and Off the Court, Contemporary Books. ISBN 978-0-8092-3041-9
- John Wooden with Jack Tobin (1972) They Call Me Coach, Word Books. ISBN 978-0876803059
  - (1985) Hardcover Revised Edition. Word Books. ISBN 978-0849904387
  - (2003) Revised Edition. McGraw-Hill Professional. ISBN 978-0-07-142491-2
- John Wooden (1966) Practical Modern Basketball. The Ronald Press Company.

== See also ==
- List of college men's basketball coaches with 600 wins
- List of NCAA Division I Men's Final Four appearances by coach
