= Fred Slaughter =

American college basketball player

Personal information
- Born: March 13, 1942
- Died: October 6, 2016 (aged 74) Santa Monica, California, U.S.
- Listed height: 6 ft 5 in (1.96 m)

Career information
- High school: Topeka (Topeka, Kansas)
- College: UCLA (1961–1964)
- NBA draft: 1964: undrafted
- Position: Center

Career highlights
- NCAA champion (1964)

Fred Leon Slaughter (March 13, 1942 – October 6, 2016) was an American college basketball player for the UCLA Bruins. He won a national championship with the Bruins in 1964, and was later one of the early African Americans to become a sports agent. He was inducted into the UCLA Athletics Hall of Fame in 2004.

Growing up in Kansas, Slaughter was a dual-sport athlete in basketball and track before leaving home to attend University of California, Los Angeles (UCLA). He continued in both sports in college, and he helped UCLA basketball coach John Wooden win the first of his 10 national championships in 12 seasons. In addition to his undergraduate degree, Slaughter also earned a Master of Business Administration (MBA) and a law degree before becoming a sports agent in 1969. He spent almost a decade as an administrator at the UCLA School of Law before leaving in 1980 to become a full-time agent. Slaughter represented professional basketball and American football players. He was also the labor union leader for referees in the National Basketball Association (NBA).

== Early life ==
Slaughter grew up in Topeka, Kansas. He attended Topeka High School, where he was the leading scorer on their basketball team, as well as the top player in Kansas. Despite a weight problem, he was also a state-champion sprinter in the 100-yard dash. He was timed at 9.9 seconds in the 100 and was sought after by multiple colleges as a track athlete.

Slaughter was heavily recruited by universities, and received 104 athletic scholarship offers. Instead of staying in-state and attending college at the University of Kansas or Kansas State University, Slaughter wanted to attend UCLA. He preferred the "better weather", and he wanted to go to a basketball program he "could help get on the map." Since UCLA's basketball coach, John Wooden, did not recruit outside of California, Slaughter wrote Wooden and asked to join their team. Wooden had coached at UCLA for 12 years, where the Bruins were consistent winners but not yet a powerhouse. The school offered him a scholarship split between track and basketball.

== College career ==
Slaughter chose to attend UCLA, part of a trend their basketball team developed to build a strong nucleus of native California athletes along with a few African Americans from out of state. The school developed a reputation for fair treatment of blacks. In his first year, Slaughter led the freshman basketball team in scoring, a feat he also matched on the freshman track team. However, Slaughter did not excel in any particular track event. At 6 feet 5 inches (1.96 m), he was considered small for a center, and his scoring opportunities decreased as his career progressed; his role was reduced to setting screens and other less glamorous duties.

Still, Slaughter was the tallest member of UCLA's 1963–64 team, but the Bruins outrebounded each of their opponents during their 30–0 season. This included their championship game against the Duke Blue Devils, who had two 6-foot-10-inch (2.08 m) starters (Hack Tison and Jay Buckley), but the Bruins outrebounded them 51–44 and forced 29 turnovers in a 98–83 victory. It was Wooden's first championship, and the beginning of a UCLA dynasty that would win nine of the next 11 National Collegiate Athletic Association (NCAA) titles. During the season, UCLA ran a 2-2-1 zone press; it was fronted by Gail Goodrich and Slaughter, who was broad enough at 235 pounds (107 kg) to make breaking the press difficult for opponents, but fast enough to race back if they advanced the ball. In each of their 30 games, the Bruins used the press to produce at least one run of two or three minutes where they outscored the opposition by at least 10 points. Known as "Bruin Blitzes", these often occurred before halftime. "There's nobody who doesn't want to score, and it took the edge off it for me," said Slaughter. "But how could I question it? It was successful." In 2004, Slaughter was inducted into the UCLA Athletics Hall of Fame.

== Professional career ==
After he graduated with a bachelor's degree in marketing, Slaughter earned an MBA at UCLA. Urged by friends such as former Bruins teammates Goodrich and Walt Hazzard, he also earned a law degree at Columbia University. He became a sports agent in 1969, when there were few in the industry and he was virtually the lone African American. "People hadn't really realized that the professional athlete needed help," Slaughter said. ""I realized it and went to school and did everything I had to do to prepare for that."

From 1972 to 1980, Slaughter served as assistant dean of Admissions and Student Affairs for the UCLA School of Law from 1972 to 1980. Afterwards, he became an agent full-time. During his career, Slaughter represented pro basketball and American football players. By 1989, he was the only black to have become a top agent for NBA players. The New York Times in 1995 called Slaughter the "dean of black sports attorneys." His clients included Hall of Fame basketball players Dennis Johnson, Jamaal Wilkes, and Clyde Drexler.

Slaughter was also leader of the National Basketball Referees Association (NBRA), the labor union for referees in the NBA. In 1990, he sent a memo to referees advising them "not to try to get cute with your receipts"; however, multiple referees were later found guilty of tax evasion by the Internal Revenue Service for falsifying expense reports on their airline tickets. He also represented the NBRA during their lockout from the league in 1995.

== Personal life ==
Slaughter married his wife, Kay, who earned a bachelor's degree in nursing from UCLA and became a hospital nurse. They had two children, including Fred W. Slaughter, who became a judge.

Slaughter died on October 6, 2016, at the age of 74 in Santa Monica, California.
