= Andrew J. Guilford =

American judge (born 1950)

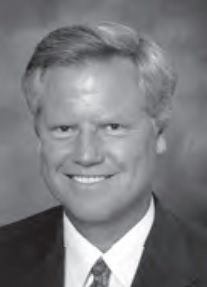

Senior Judge of the United States District Court for the Central District of California
- In office July 5, 2019 – January 31, 2020

Judge of the United States District Court for the Central District of California
- In office June 26, 2006 – July 5, 2019
- Appointed by: George W. Bush
- Preceded by: Dickran Tevrizian
- Succeeded by: Fred W. Slaughter

Personal details
- Born: Andrew John Guilford; November 28, 1950 (age 75) Santa Monica, California, U.S.
- Spouse: Loreen M. Gogain
- Education: University of California, Los Angeles (AB); UCLA School of Law (JD)

Andrew John Guilford (born November 28, 1950) is a former United States district judge of the United States District Court for the Central District of California.

== Education and career ==
Born in Santa Monica, California, Guilford received an Artium Baccalaureus degree from the University of California, Los Angeles in 1972. While working on his undergraduate degree he served as president of the Sigma Pi fraternity chapter at UCLA. He earned his Juris Doctor degree from the UCLA School of Law in 1975. He was in private practice in Costa Mesa, California, from 1975 to 2006.

== Federal judicial service ==
On January 25, 2006, Guilford was nominated by President George W. Bush to a seat on the United States District Court for the Central District of California vacated by Dickran Tevrizian. Guilford was confirmed by the United States Senate on June 22, 2006, and received his commission on June 26, 2006. He assumed senior status on July 5, 2019. He retired from active service on January 31, 2020.

Legal offices
Preceded by Dickran Tevrizian	Judge of the United States District Court for the Central District of California; 2006–2019	Succeeded by Fred W. Slaughter
