= Ragen Moss =

Visual artist

Ragen Moss (born 1978) is a visual artist based in Los Angeles. She has exhibited in the United States and Europe.

== Education ==
Moss received a Bachelor of Arts degree in Art History from Columbia University in 2000. She received a Juris Doctor degree from UCLA in 2005 and a Master of Fine Arts degree from the University of California Los Angeles in 2012.

== Work ==
Moss' sculptural work is made from layered transparent polyethylene forms that are embedded with paint that roughly resemble biomorphic human shapes. A review in The New York Times described her work as being "concerned with the body and how it functions within society." Moss had work included in the 2019 Whitney Biennial. Some of her works include texts, such as "manipulative deceptive device or contrivance" which directly refers to insider trading violations.

In 2021, Moss contributed to Art Basel Unlimited with her work "Humane Imagination", consisting of 10 new sculptures that reflect upon the potential of the human mind.

Moss' most recent exhibition, titled CONSPIRE, was presented in Berlin. The installation consisted of seven hanging bulbous sculptures made of painted polyethylene paired with seven glass and metal canisters in which actual flames burn.

Moss' work was included in the exhibition, Day Jobs, at the Blanton Museum of Art. She works as a lawyer in her day job. She has spoken publicly on the ability of art to "perform specific and pointed work on Constitutional questions" including human rights and reproductive freedom.

== Collections ==
Moss' work is held in the permanent collection of the Whitney Museum of American Art, and the Museum of Contemporary Art, Los Angeles.
