= Fred W. Slaughter =

American judge (born 1973)

Fred Slaughter
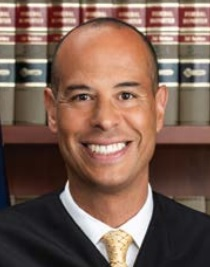

Judge of the United States District Court for the Central District of California
- Incumbent
- Assumed office April 19, 2022
- Appointed by: Joe Biden
- Preceded by: Andrew J. Guilford

Judge of the Orange County Superior Court
- In office January 31, 2014 – April 19, 2022
- Appointed by: Jerry Brown
- Preceded by: Gregory Munoz
- Succeeded by: Alma Hernandez

Personal details
- Born: 1973 (age 51–52); Santa Monica, California, U.S.
- Political party: Democratic
- Parent: Fred Slaughter (father)
- Education: University of California, Los Angeles (BA, JD)

Fred Wallace Slaughter (born 1973) is an American lawyer who is a United States district judge of the United States District Court for the Central District of California. He previously served as a judge on the California Superior Court for Orange County from 2014 to 2022.

== Education ==
Slaughter earned a Bachelor of Arts degree from the University of California, Los Angeles in 1996 and a Juris Doctor from the UCLA School of Law in 1999. Slaughter's father, Fred Slaughter, was a basketball player for the UCLA Bruins and one of the first African Americans to work as a sports agent. His mother, Kay, was a nurse. He has one sister, Hilary.

== Career ==
Slaughter began his career as a law clerk in the Los Angeles City Attorney’s Office. From 2000 to 2002, Slaughter served as a deputy city attorney. From 2004 to 2006, he worked as a coordinator for Project Safe Neighborhoods. Slaughter then worked as an assistant United States attorney for the Central District of California, District of Oregon, and District of Arizona. He was appointed to serve as a judge of the Orange County Superior Court by Governor Jerry Brown to the seat vacated by the retirement of Judge Gregory Munoz. He was sworn in on January 31, 2014.

=== Federal judicial service ===
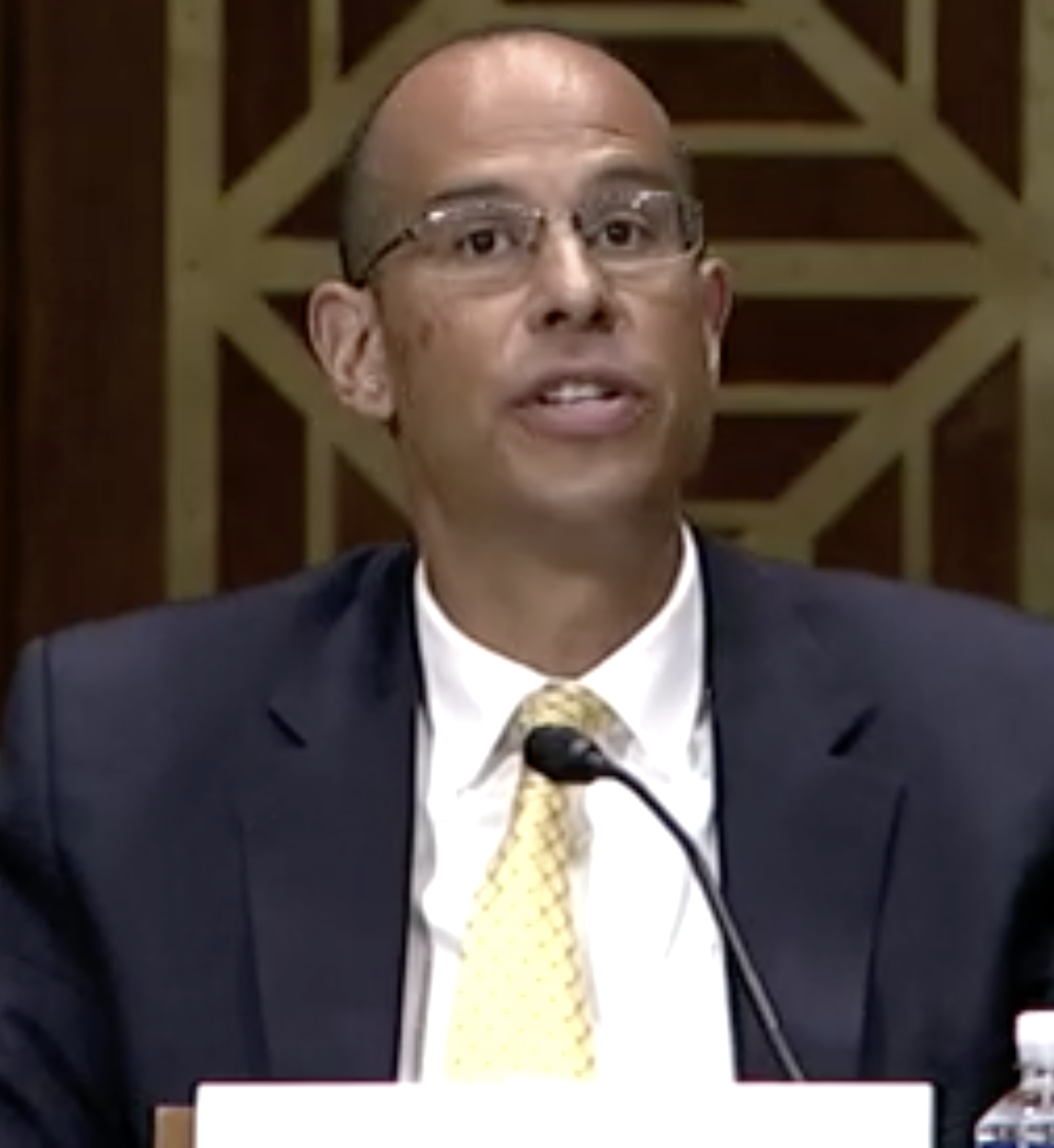
Slaughter testifying to the Senate Judiciary Committee

On December 15, 2021, President Joe Biden nominated Slaughter to serve as a United States district judge of the United States District Court for the Central District of California. President Biden nominated Slaughter to the seat vacated by Judge Andrew J. Guilford, who assumed senior status on July 5, 2019. On January 12, 2022, a hearing on his nomination was held before the Senate Judiciary Committee. On February 10, 2022, his nomination was reported out of committee by a 15–7 vote. On March 16, 2022, the United States Senate invoked cloture on his nomination by a 56–41 vote. On March 17, 2022, his nomination was confirmed by a 57–41 vote. He received his judicial commission on April 19, 2022.

== See also ==
- List of African-American federal judges
- List of African-American jurists

Legal offices
Preceded by Andrew J. Guilford	Judge of the United States District Court for the Central District of California; 2022–present	Incumbent
