= Kenny Washington (basketball) =

American basketball player and coach

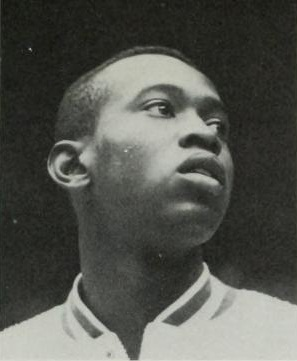
- Washington in 1964

Personal information
- Born: c.1944
- Listed height: 6 ft 3 in (1.91 m)

Career information
- High school: Robert Smalls (Beaufort, South Carolina)
- College: UCLA (1963–1966)
- NBA draft: 1966: 8th round, 71st overall pick
- Drafted by: San Francisco Warriors
- Position: Guard

Career history

Coaching
- 1974–1975: UCLA (women's)

Career highlights
- 2× NCAA champion (1964, 1965)
- Stats at Basketball Reference

Kenneth Washington (born c. 1944) is an American former basketball player and coach. As a player, he won two national championships playing college basketball with the UCLA Bruins, where he played on national championship teams in 1964 and 1965. Washington represented the United States national team in the 1970 FIBA World Championship where he was selected to the All-Tournament team. He was also the first head coach in UCLA women's basketball history.

== Playing career ==
Washington, a 6-foot-3-inch (1.91 m) guard out of Robert Smalls High School in Beaufort, South Carolina, played for coach John Wooden at UCLA from 1963 to 1966, where he was a key member of Wooden's first two NCAA championship teams in 1964 and 1965. As the sixth man of those teams, Washington helped the Bruins establish what is now known as a storied tradition. Washington was particularly effective in his two championship appearances, netting 26 points and grabbing 12 rebounds in the final of the 1964 NCAA tournament and scoring 17 in the 1965 championship and earning a spot on the All-Final Four team.

After graduation, Washington was drafted by the San Francisco Warriors in the eighth round (71st pick overall) of the 1966 NBA draft, but he never played in the league. He played basketball in Europe.

=== National team career ===
In 1970, Washington was a member of the United States national team that played in the 1970 FIBA World Championship in Yugoslavia, finishing fifth. He was the second-leading scorer on the team, averaging 12.4 points in 9 games and was named to the FIBA WC All-Tournament first team.

== Coaching career ==
In 1974, Washington was named the first intercollegiate head coach in UCLA women's basketball history. He coached one season, leading the Bruins to an 18–4 record behind star Ann Meyers.

He is the uncle of Major League Baseball player Jason Heyward.
