= Lily, Kentucky =

Unincorporated community in Kentucky, United States

- Unincorporated community
- Location in Kentucky Location in the United States
- Coordinates: 37°1′28″N 84°4′31″W
- Country: United States
- State: Kentucky
- County: Laurel
- Elevation: 1,119 ft (341 m)
- Time zone: UTC-6 (Eastern Time Zone)
  - Summer (DST): UTC-5 (EST)
- ZIP codes: 40740
- GNIS feature ID: 513422

Lily is an unincorporated community and coal town in Laurel County, Kentucky, United States. Their post office has been open since 1881.

== Geography ==
Lily is on Kentucky Route 552 in Laurel, near London.

=== Climate ===
The climate in this area is characterized by hot, humid summers and generally mild to cool winters. According to the Köppen Climate Classification system, Lily has a humid subtropical climate, abbreviated "Cfa" on climate maps.

== Notable people ==
- Silas House, Novelist and environmental activist.
- Grenville Lewis, college and professional football player, who later served as president and manager of the Ideal Block Coal Company in Lily.
- Doug McIntosh, college basketball player for the UCLA Bruins from 1963 to 1966.
