= 1964–65 Michigan Wolverines men's basketball team =

American college basketball season

1964–65 Michigan Wolverines men's basketball

Big Ten champions NCAA regular season champions NCAA tournament, runner-up

National Championship Game, L 81-90 vs. UCLA
- Conference: Big Ten Conference

Ranking
- Coaches: No. 1
- AP: No. 1
- Record: 24–4 (13–1 Big Ten)
- Head coach: Dave Strack
- Assistant coaches: James Skala; Tom Jorgensen (Freshman coach)
- MVP: Cazzie Russell
- Captain: Larry Tregoning
- Home arena: Fielding H. Yost Field House

1964–65 Big Ten Conference men's basketball standings
	Conf.				Overall
Team	W		L	PCT	W		L	PCT
No. 1 Michigan	13	–	1	.929	24	–	4	.857
No. 7 Minnesota	11	–	3	.786	19	–	5	.792
Illinois	10	–	4	.714	18	–	6	.750
Indiana	9	–	5	.643	19	–	5	.792
Iowa	8	–	6	.571	14	–	10	.583
Ohio State	6	–	8	.429	12	–	12	.500
Purdue	5	–	9	.357	12	–	12	.500
Wisconsin	4	–	10	.286	9	–	13	.409
Northwestern	3	–	11	.214	7	–	17	.292
Michigan State	1	–	13	.071	5	–	18	.217
Rankings from AP Poll

The 1964–65 Michigan Wolverines men's basketball team represented the University of Michigan in intercollegiate college basketball during the 1964–65 season. The team played its home games at Fielding H. Yost Field House (renamed Yost Ice Arena in 1973) on the school's campus in Ann Arbor, Michigan. Under the direction of head coach Dave Strack, the team won the Big Ten Conference Championship.

== Season review ==
This was the second of three consecutive Big Ten titles and Michigan's second visit to the NCAA Division I men's basketball tournament final four. The team earned the Big Ten team statistical championships for both scoring offense (92.9) and scoring margin (12.2). Junior Cazzie Russell averaged 25.7 points per game and senior Bill Buntin added 20.1. The team spent the entire 15-week season ranked in the Associated Press Top Ten Poll, starting and ending the season ranked number one and holding that position in ten of the fifteen weeks of the poll. The team also finished the season ranked number one in the final UPI Coaches' Poll. Larry Tregoning served as team captain, while Russell and Buntin shared team MVP.

The team was the first Michigan team to defeat the number one ranked team in the country when it beat Wichita State on December 14 by an 87–85 margin. As of 2010 only two Michigan teams have done so. On March 20, 1965, Oliver Darden went 11 for 11 in free throw attempts against UCLA, which was a school single-game record for most without a miss until Craig Dill made 12 on February 18, 1966.

== Schedule ==
1964-65 Overall: 24-4 Big Ten: 13-1 (1st | Champions) Postseason: NCAA (Mideast) (Final Four; Runner-up) Head Coach: Dave Strack Staff: James Skala & Tom Jorgensen (Freshmen) Captain: Larry Tregoning Home Arena: Yost Field House (7,500)

Date Rk Opponent H/A W/L Score +/-
12/1/1964 #1 Ball State H W 92-70 +22
12/5/1964 #1 at #5 Duke A W 86-79 +7
12/7/1964 #1 Missouri H W 91-61 +30
12/9/1964 #1 Indiana State H W 102-64 +38
12/12/1964 #1 at Nebraska A L 73-74 -1
12/14/1964 #1 vs. #2 Wichita State N1 W 87-85 +2
12/23/1964 #1 Butler H W 99-81 +18
12/28/1964 #1 vs. Manhattan N2 W 90-77 +13
12/30/1964 #1 vs. Princeton N2 W 80-78 +2
1/2/1965 #1 vs. St. John’s N2 L 74-75 -1
1/9/1965 #3 Illinois+ H W 89-83 +6
1/16/1965 #2 at Northwestern+ A W 90-68 +22
1/23/1965 #2 Purdue+ H W 103-84 +19
1/26/1965 #2 at Michigan State+ (OT) A W 103-98 +5
1/30/1965 #2 at Purdue+ A W 98-81 +17
2/8/1965 #1 Iowa+ H W 81-66 +15
2/13/1965 #1 Michigan State+ H W 98-83 +15
2/15/1965 #1 at #8 Indiana+ (2OT) A W 96-95 +1
2/20/1965 #1 Ohio State+ H W 100-61 +39
2/23/1965 #1 at #8 Minnesota+ A W 91-78 +13
2/27/1965 #1 at Illinois+ A W 80-79 +1
3/2/1965 #1 Wisconsin+ H W 98-75 +23
3/6/1965 #1 #6 Minnesota+ H W 88-85 +3
3/8/1965 #1 at Ohio State+ A L 85-93 -8
3/12/1965 #1 vs. Dayton N3 W 98-71 +27
3/13/1965 #1 vs. #5 Vanderbilt N3 W 87-85 +2
3/19/1965 #1 vs. Princeton N4 W 93-76 +17
3/20/1965 #1 vs. #2 UCLA N4 L 80-91 -11

(1) Played in Detroit, Mich. (Cobo Arena) (2) Holiday Festival, New York, N.Y. (Madison Square Garden) (3) NCAA Tournament, Lexington, Ky. (Memorial Coliseum) (4) NCAA Tournament, Portland, Ore. (Memorial Coliseum)

== Postseason ==
In the 23-team 1965 NCAA Division I men's basketball tournament, Michigan improved upon its 1964 tournament final four appearance by reaching the national championship game against the UCLA Bruins where they were upset, 91–80. As it had the year before the team had an opening round bye. Then it defeated the Dayton Flyers 98–71 and the Vanderbilt Commodores 87–85 to win the Mideast region. In the Final Four, Michigan defeated the Bill Bradley-led Princeton Tigers team 93–76, before they were upset by UCLA in the National Championship game. In the championship game, Michigan had three players disqualified, which was an NCAA tournament championship game record that stood until March 31, 1997. The season marked John Wooden's second consecutive championship as UCLA coach and the second of what would become nine championships in ten seasons.

=== NCAA tournament summary ===
- Mideast
  - Michigan 98, Dayton 71
  - Michigan 87, Vanderbilt 85
- Final Four
  - Michigan 93, Princeton 76
  - UCLA 91, Michigan 80

== Accomplishments ==
Various members of the team earned significant recognitions: Strack earned the UPI College Basketball Coach of the Year. Russell won the Chicago Tribune Silver Basketball as Big Ten MVP. Russell and Buntin were both 1965 NCAA Men's Basketball All-Americans. Following the season Bill Buntin became the first Wolverine selected in the NBA draft.

That season, Buntin surpassed John Tidwell and established the Michigan career scoring record with 1725 and a 21.8 average, but Russell would end his career the following year with superior numbers. Russell eclipsed his own single-season point total record of 670 with a total of 694 ( a number he would surpass the following season). Buntin also surpassed, M. C. Burton, Jr.'s 1957–59 career rebound total of 831 and average of 12.59 with 1037 and 13.13, but Rudy Tomjanovich would set the current standards by surpassing both of these in 1970. However, Buntin's total of 58 career point-rebound double doubles remains a Michigan record. While Russell eclipsed Buntin's single-season school free throw record of 151 by one, Buntin set the school's career total record of 385, but both of these marks would be eclipsed by Russell the following season. The team continues to hold the single-season Big Ten Conference rebounding record with 1521, a total that was tied by the national champion 2000 Michigan State Spartans The team set the single-season team points per game Big Ten Conference record with 92.9 (1,300 in 14 conference games). The record would be broken the following season by the Wolverines. The team set the school single-season free throws made record of 494, which would last until 1977. On December 1, 1964, the team began a 17-game home winning streak against the Ball State that continued through a January 29, 1966, victory over Wisconsin. This surpassed the 16-game streak from February 22, 1947 – February 7, 1949, and stood as the longest home winning streak in school history until a 22-game streak that started on January 12, 1976.

=== Statistics ===
The team posted the following statistics:

Name	GP	GS	Min	Avg	FG	FGA	FG%	3FG	3FGA	3FG%	FT	FTA	FT%	OR	DR	RB	Avg	Ast	Avg	PF	DQ	TO	Stl	Blk	Pts	Avg
Cazzie Russell	27	27			271	558	0.486	--	--		152	186	0.817			208	7.7			66	3				694	25.7
Bill Buntin	28	28			221	454	0.487	--	--		122	159	0.767			323	11.5			87	8				564	20.1
Oliver Darden	28	25			152	322	0.472	--	--		59	95	0.621			246	8.8			88	4				363	13.0
Larry Tregoning	28	28			133	292	0.455	--	--		44	63	0.698			211	7.5			73	2				310	11.1
George Pomey	28	20			86	194	0.443	--	--		37	57	0.649			104	3.7			59	0				209	7.5
John Thompson	23	11			52	119	0.437	--	--		18	25	0.720			29	1.3			43	0				122	5.3
Jim Myers	26	0			44	140	0.314	--	--		14	23	0.609			117	4.5			35	0				102	3.9
Craig Dill	20	0			32	66	0.485	--	--		30	42	0.714			54	2.7			27	0				94	4.7
John Clawson	16	0			22	48	0.458	--	--		6	11	0.545			23	1.4			21	1				50	3.1
Tom Ludwig	11	0			5	17	0.294	--	--		4	4	1.000			7	0.6			9	0				14	1.3
Dennis Bankey	7	0			0	6	0.000	--	--		5	6	0.833			5	0.7			5	0				5	0.7
Dan Brown	6	0			1	7	0.143	--	--		1	3	0.333			8	1.3			6	0				3	0.5
Van Tillotson	3	0			0	1	0.000	--	--		2	5	0.400			4	1.3			2	0				2	0.7
TEAM	28															173	6.2					26				
Charles Adams	1	0			0	1	0.000	--	--		0	0				0	0.0			0	0				0	0.0
Season Total	28				1019	2225	0.458				494	679	0.728			1512	54.0			521	18				2532	90.4
Opponents	28				876	1979	0.443	--	--		448	651	0.688			1156	41.3			514	20				2200	78.6

== Rankings ==
Ranking movements Legend: ██ Increase in ranking ██ Decrease in ranking
	Week														
Poll	Pre	1	2	3	4	5	6	7	8	9	10	11	12	13	Final
AP Poll	1	1	2	1	1	3	2	2	2	1	1	1	1	1	1

== Team players drafted into the NBA ==
Five players from this team were selected in the NBA draft.

Year	Round	Pick	Overall	Player	NBA Club
1965	1	Territorial	2	Bill Buntin	Detroit Pistons
1965	15	3	103	George Pomey	St. Louis Hawks
1966	1	1	1	Cazzie Russell	New York Knicks
1966	3	2	22	Oliver Darden	Detroit Pistons
1967	4	11	42	Craig Dill	San Diego Rockets

== See also ==
- NCAA Men's Division I Final Four appearances by coaches
- NCAA Men's Division I Final Four appearances by school
- List of the NCAA Division I men's basketball tournament Final Four participants
- NCAA Men's Division I Tournament bids by school
- NCAA Men's Division I Tournament bids by school and conference
- NCAA Division I men's basketball tournament all-time team records
