= 1964–65 Illinois Fighting Illini men's basketball team =

American college basketball season

1964–65 Illinois Fighting Illini men's basketball

Kentucky Invitational Tournament, Champion
- Conference: Big Ten Conference

Ranking
- Coaches: No. 16
- Record: 18-6 (10-4 Big Ten)
- Head coach: Harry Combes (18th season)
- Assistant coaches: Howie Braun (28th season); Jim Wright (7th season)
- MVP: Skip Thoren
- Captain: Skip Thoren
- Home arena: Assembly Hall

1964–65 Big Ten Conference men's basketball standings
	Conf.				Overall
Team	W		L	PCT	W		L	PCT
No. 1 Michigan	13	–	1	.929	24	–	4	.857
No. 7 Minnesota	11	–	3	.786	19	–	5	.792
Illinois	10	–	4	.714	18	–	6	.750
Indiana	9	–	5	.643	19	–	5	.792
Iowa	8	–	6	.571	14	–	10	.583
Ohio State	6	–	8	.429	12	–	12	.500
Purdue	5	–	9	.357	12	–	12	.500
Wisconsin	4	–	10	.286	9	–	13	.409
Northwestern	3	–	11	.214	7	–	17	.292
Michigan State	1	–	13	.071	5	–	18	.217
Rankings from AP Poll

The 1964–65 Illinois Fighting Illini men's basketball team represented the University of Illinois.

== Regular season ==
Head coach Harry Combes Fighting Illini basketball team returned to their winning ways for the 1964–65 season. Even though they were not ranked in the pre-season top 20 of college basketball teams, they peaked at #6 during the course of the season in the Associated Press and finished the season ranked #16 in the coaches poll. During the course of the season, the Illini would play in two mid-season tournaments and participate 24 regular season games, the most since 1908 when they played in 26. The tournaments the Illini would participate in would be the ECAC Quaker City Tournament in Philadelphia and a return trip to the Kentucky Invitational Tournament in Lexington, Kentucky. The highlight of the season would happen in the season opener when the Illini would defeat the previous season's national champion UCLA Bruins by a score of 110–83. The 1965 Bruins would finish with a 28–2 record and their second national championship.

The 1964–65 team utilized several returning lettermen including the leading scorer, team "MVP" and captain, Skip Thoren. It also saw the return of team seniors Tal Brody, Bogie Redmon, Bill McKeown as well as Juniors Don Freeman, Jim Vopicka and Larry Hinton to their lineup. It also included sophomores Jim Dawson, Bob Johansen and future Dallas Cowboy, Preston Pearson. The Illini finished the season with a conference record of 10 wins and 4 losses, finishing in 3rd place in the Big Ten. They would finish with an overall record of 18 wins and 6 losses. The starting lineup included Skip Thoren at the center position, Tal Brody and Jim Dawson at guard and Don Freeman and Bogie Redmon at the forward slots.

=== Roster ===
1964–65 Illinois Fighting Illini men's basketball team
Players
Coaches

Pos.	#	Name	Height	Weight	Year	Previous school	Hometown
G	11	Larry Miller	5 ft 8 in (1.73 m)	161 lb (73 kg)	Sr	Connellsville High School	Connellsville, Pennsylvania
G	12	Tal Brody	6 ft 2 in (1.88 m)	173 lb (78 kg)	Sr	Central High School	Trenton, New Jersey
F	14	Jerry Mettille	6 ft 4 in (1.93 m)	179 lb (81 kg)	So	Morris Community High School	Morris, Illinois
G	15	Donnie Freeman	6 ft 2 in (1.88 m)	179 lb (81 kg)	Jr	Madison High School	Madison, Illinois
F	21	Bob Johansen	6 ft 4 in (1.93 m)	185 lb (84 kg)	So	Geneva High School	Geneva, Illinois
G	22	Jim Vopicka	6 ft 1 in (1.85 m)	175 lb (79 kg)	Jr	Morton West High School	Brookfield, Illinois
G	23	Ron Beeks	6 ft 1 in (1.85 m)	180 lb (82 kg)	Sr	Princeton High School	Princeton, New Jersey
G	24	Jim Dawson	6 ft 0 in (1.83 m)	172 lb (78 kg)	So	York High School	Elmhurst, Illinois
G	25	Preston Pearson	6 ft 1 in (1.85 m)	195 lb (88 kg)	So	Freeport High School	Freeport, Illinois
F	30	Deon Flessner	6 ft 4 in (1.93 m)	193 lb (88 kg)	So	Fithian High School	Fithian, Illinois
F	33	Bogie Redmon	6 ft 5 in (1.96 m)	225 lb (102 kg)	Sr	Collinsville High School	Collinsville, Illinois
G	34	Bill McKeown	6 ft 2 in (1.88 m)	185 lb (84 kg)	Sr	Clinton High School	Clinton, Illinois
C	35	Skip Thoren (C)	6 ft 8 in (2.03 m)	232 lb (105 kg)	Sr	Rockford East High School	Rockford, Illinois
G/F	40	Bob Brown	6 ft 2 in (1.88 m)	190 lb (86 kg)	Jr	P. S. Dupont High School	Wilmington, DE
F	43	Larry Hinton	6 ft 2 in (1.88 m)	194 lb (88 kg)	Jr	Shelbyville High School	Shelbyville, Illinois
F	44	Mike Graville	6 ft 1 in (1.85 m)	175 lb (79 kg)	Jr	Madison High School	Madison, Illinois
F	54	Dan Lee	6 ft 3 in (1.91 m)	175 lb (79 kg)	Jr	Attica High School	Attica, Indiana

Head coach

- Harry Combes (University of Illinois) (18th year)

Assistant coach(es)

- Howie Braun (University of Illinois) (28th year)
- Jim Wright (University of Illinois) (7th year)

Legend

- (C) Team captain
- (S) Suspended
- (I) Ineligible
- (W) Walk-on
- Injured
- Current redshirt

Roster

== Schedule ==
Date time, TV	Rank^{#}	Opponent^{#}	Result	Record	Site (attendance) city, state
Non-Conference regular season
12/4/1964*		No. 2 UCLA	W 110-83	1-0	Assembly Hall (11,873); Champaign, IL
12/5/1964*		at St. Louis	L 64-79	1-1	Kiel Auditorium (9,230); St. Louis, MO
12/8/1964*		Bowling Green	W 100-62	2-1	Assembly Hall (9,889); Champaign, IL
12/12/1964*		Washington (St. Louis)	W 103-59	3-1	Assembly Hall (9,027); Champaign, IL
12/15/1964		at Wisconsin	W 70-56	4-1 (1-0)	Wisconsin Field House (9,538); Madison, WI
12/18/1964*		vs. Dayton; Kentucky Invitational Tournament	W 104-86	5-1	Memorial Coliseum (11,800); Lexington, KY
12/19/1964*		at No. 8 Kentucky; Kentucky Invitational Tournament	W 91-86	6-1	Memorial Coliseum (11,800); Lexington, KY
12/26/1964*	No. 7	vs. NYU; ECAC Quaker City Tournament	W 102-79	7-1	Palestra (9,500); Philadelphia, PA
12/28/1964*	No. 7	at St. Joseph's; ECAC Quaker City Tournament	L 71-75	7-2	Palestra (9,500); Philadelphia, PA
12/29/1964*	No. 6	at Villanova; ECAC Quaker City Tournament	W 74-65	8-2	Palestra (9,500); Philadelphia, PA
Big Ten regular season
1/4/1965	No. 6	No. 2 Indiana; Rivalry	W 88-81	9-2 (2-0)	Assembly Hall (16,128); Champaign, IL
1/9/1965		at No. 3 Michigan	L 83-89	9-3 (2-1)	Yost Field House (7,600); Ann Arbor, MI
1/16/1965		Minnesota	W 75-72	10-3 (3-1)	Assembly Hall (10,789); Champaign, IL
1/30/1965*		vs. Notre Dame	W 101-87	11-3	Chicago Stadium (16,746); Chicago, IL
2/6/1965		Purdue	W 121-93	12-3 (4-1)	Assembly Hall (8,828); Champaign, IL
2/8/1965		at Ohio State	W 86-71	13-3 (5-1)	St. John Arena (7,626); Columbus, OH
2/13/1965	No. 10	at Minnesota	L 90-105	13-4 (5-2)	Williams Arena (8,184); Minneapolis, MN
2/16/1965		Ohio State	W 95-72	14-4 (6-2)	Assembly Hall (8,751); Champaign, IL
2/20/1965		at Michigan State	W 100-89	15-4 (7-2)	Jenison Fieldhouse (8,643); East Lansing, MI
2/23/1965		Iowa; Rivalry	W 97-80	16-4 (8-2)	Assembly Hall (13,387); Champaign, IL
2/27/1965		No. 1 Michigan	L 79-80	16-5 (8-3)	Assembly Hall (16,128); Champaign, IL
3/2/1965		at Northwestern; Rivalry	W 93-70	17-5 (9-3)	McGaw Memorial Hall (5,500); Evanston, IL
3/6/1965		at Iowa; Rivlary	L 84-94	17-6 (9-4)	Iowa Field House (10,500); Iowa City, IA
3/9/1965		Michigan State	W 121-89	18-6 (10-4)	Assembly Hall (10,456); Champaign, IL
*Non-conference game. ^{#}Rankings from AP Poll. (#) Tournament seedings in parentheses. All times are in Central Time.

== Player stats ==
Player	Games played	Field goals	Free throws	Rebounds	Points
Skip Thoren	24	219	95	349	533
Tal Brody	24	183	95	108	463
Don Freeman	24	178	84	226	440
Bogie Redmon	24	155	55	192	365
Bill McKeown	9	41	17	39	99
Jim Dawson	22	38	11	41	87
Jim Vopicka	23	34	19	61	87
Bob Johansen	19	56	22	34	56
Larry Hinton	18	36	14	17	36
Preston Pearson	17	16	4	18	16
Deon Flessner	13	4	5	14	13
Bob Brown	13	2	6	8	10
Jerry Mettile	9	3	2	8	8

== Awards and honors ==
- Bogie Redmon
  - Converse Honorable Mention All-American
- Tal Brody
  - Helms 1st Team All-American
  - Converse 2nd Team All-American
  - Sporting News 2nd Team All-American
- Duane "Skip" Thoren
  - Helms 1st Team All-American
  - Converse 2nd Team All-American
  - Associated Press 2nd Team All-American
  - United Press 3rd Team All-American
  - Basketball News 3rd Team All-American
  - National Association of Basketball Coaches 3rd Team All-American
  - Team Most Valuable Player

== Team players drafted into the NBA ==
Player	NBA club	Round	Pick
Tal Brody	Baltimore Bullets	2	4
Skip Thoren	Baltimore Bullets	4	4
Bogie Redmon	Baltimore Bullets	10	2
Roger Taylor	Baltimore Bullets	17	1
