= 1965 NCAA University Division basketball championship game =

1965 NCAA Tournament Championship Game
National championship game
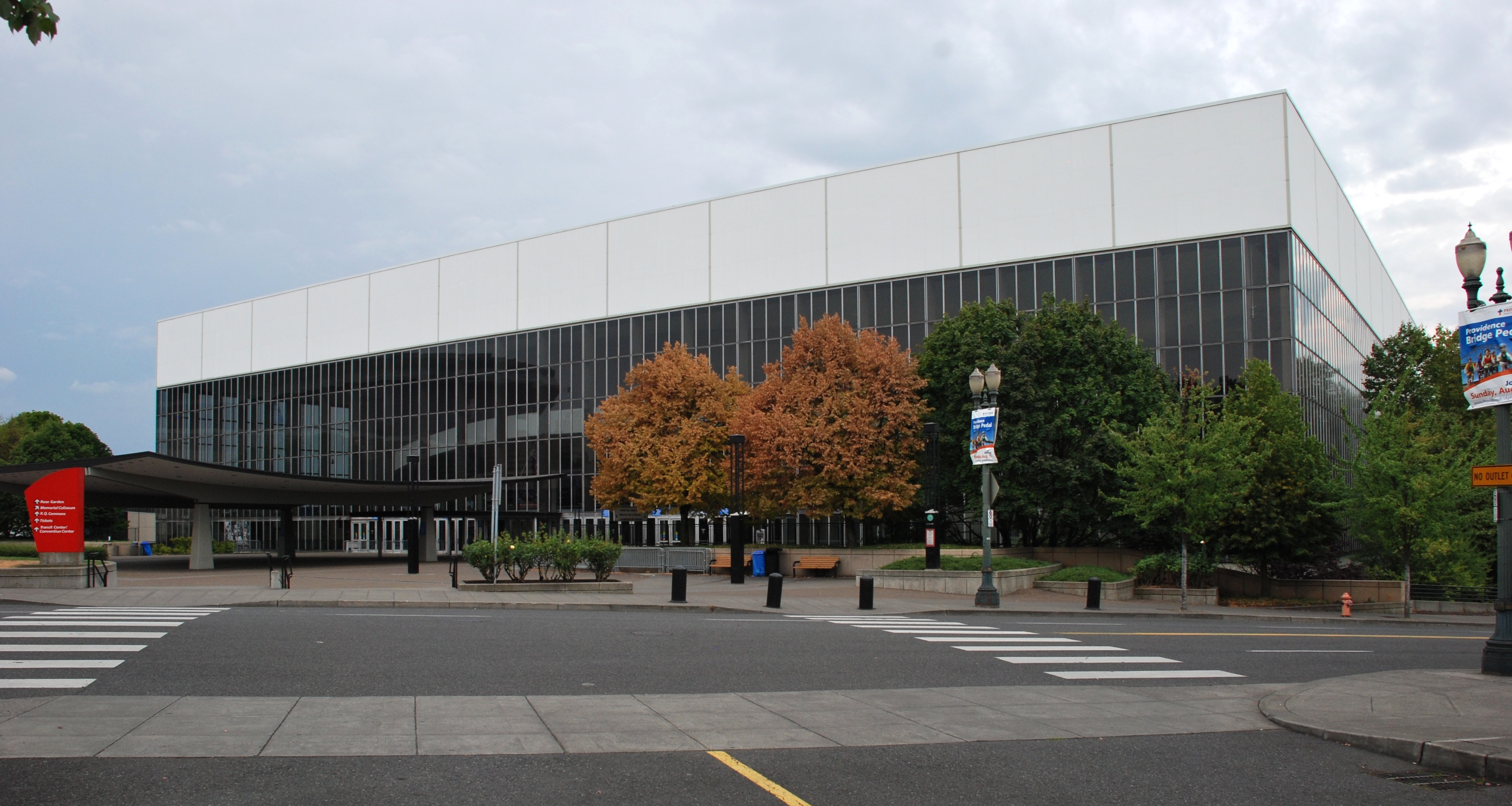
- The Memorial Coliseum in Portland, Oregon, hosted the championship game.
| UCLA Bruins | Michigan Wolverines |
| AAWU | Big Ten |
| (27-2) | (23-4) |
|---|---|
| 91 | 80 |
| Head coach: John Wooden | Head coach: Dave Strack |
- AP: 2
- Coaches: 2
- AP: 1
- Coaches: 1
| | 1st half | 2nd half | Total |
|---|---|---|---|
| UCLA Bruins | 47 | 44 | 91 |
| Michigan Wolverines | 34 | 46 | 80 |
- Date: March 20, 1965
- Venue: Memorial Coliseum, Portland, Oregon
- Favorite: Michigan
- Attendance: 13,204

United States TV coverage
- Network: Sports Network Incorporated

The 1965 NCAA University Division Basketball Championship Game was the finals of the 1965 NCAA University Division basketball tournament and it determined the national champion for the 1964-65 NCAA University Division men's basketball season. The game was played on March 20, 1965, at the Memorial Coliseum in Portland, Oregon. It featured the second-ranked and defending national champion UCLA Bruins of the Athletic Association of Western Universities, and the top-ranked Michigan Wolverines of the Big Ten Conference.

The Bruins upset the top-ranked Wolverines to repeat as national champions. To date, this is the last national championship game to be played between the teams ranked #1 and #2 in both the final AP and Coaches polls.

== Participating teams ==
=== UCLA Bruins ===
- West
  - UCLA 100, BYU 76
  - UCLA 101, San Francisco 93
- Final Four
  - UCLA 108, Wichita State 89

=== Michigan Wolverines ===
- Mideast
  - Michigan 98, Dayton 71
  - Michigan 87, Vanderbilt 85
- Final Four
  - Michigan 93, Princeton 76

== Game summary ==
Sports Network Inc.

March 20, 1965

#2 UCLA Bruins 91, #1 Michigan Wolverines 80
Scoring by half: 47-34, 44-46
| Pts: Gail Goodrich 42; Rebs: Edgar Lacey 7 Asts: Mike Lynn 2 | Pts: Cazzie Russell 28; Rebs: Bill Buntin 6 Asts: Cazzie Russell, Bill Buntin 1 |

Memorial Coliseum, Portland, Oregon
Attendance: 13,204
