= Tal Brody =

Basketball player

Tal Brody טל ברודי
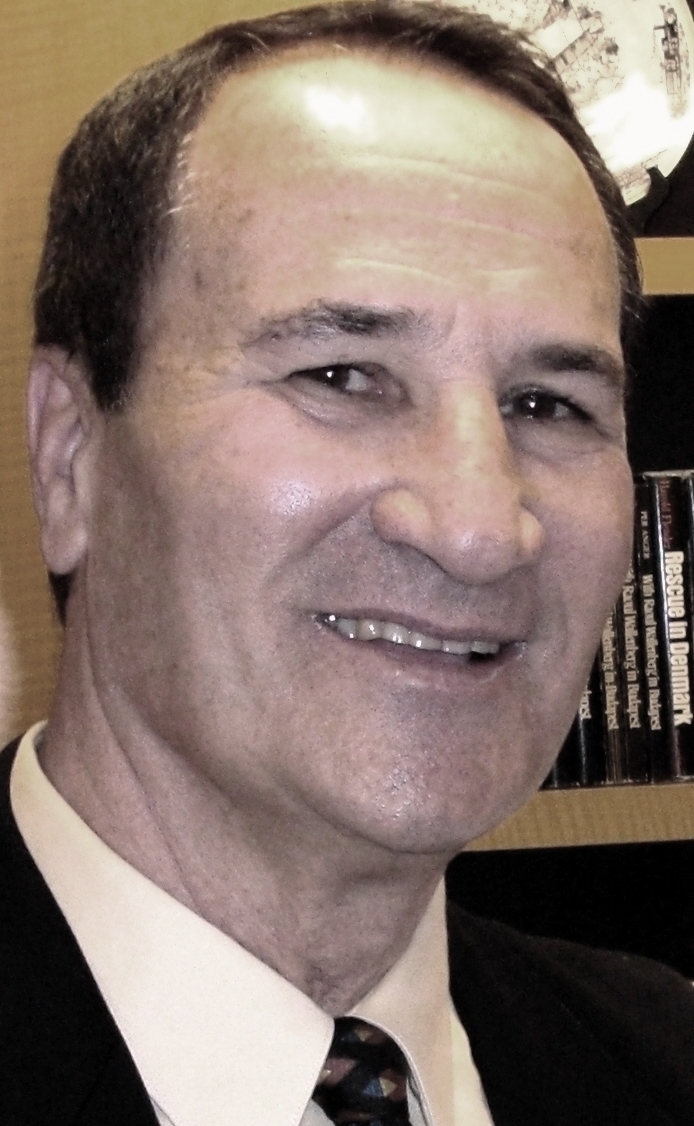
- Brody in 2011

Personal information
- Born: August 30, 1943 (age 83) Trenton, New Jersey, U.S.
- Listed height: 6 ft 1.75 in (1.87 m)
- Listed weight: 175 lb (79 kg)

Career information
- High school: Trenton Central (Trenton, New Jersey)
- College: Illinois (1962–1965)
- NBA draft: 1965: 1st round, 12th overall pick
- Drafted by: Baltimore Bullets
- Playing career: 1966–1980
- Position: Shooting guard
- Number: 6

Career history
- 1966–1967, 1973–1980: Maccabi Tel Aviv

Career highlights
- EuroLeague champion (1977); FIBA Saporta Cup Finals Top Scorer (1967); 10× Israeli League champion (1967, 1968, 1973–1980); 6× Israeli State Cup winner (1973, 1975, 1977–1980); Israeli Sportsman of the Year (1967); FIBA European Selection (1978); Israel Prize (1979); Israeli Basketball Hall of Fame; 101 Greats of European Basketball (2018); Second-team All-American – SN, Converse (1965); All-Big Ten (1965); No. 12 jersey retired by the University of Illinois
- Stats at Basketball Reference
Medals
Representing Israel
Men's basketball
Asian Games
Gold medal – first place	1974 Iran
Maccabiah Games
Gold medal – first place	1965 Tel Aviv
Gold medal – first place	1969 Tel Aviv

Talbot "Tal" Brody (Hebrew: טל ברודי; born August 30, 1943), nicknamed Mr. Basketball, is an American-Israeli former professional basketball player and current goodwill ambassador of Israel. Brody was drafted #12 in the 1965 NBA draft, but chose to pass up an NBA career, to instead play basketball in Israel. He played on national basketball teams of both the United States and Israel, and served in the armies of both countries.

A New Jersey All-star basketball player in high school, Brody led his team to an undefeated state championship. In college, he was a high-scoring, slick-passing All-American and All-Big Ten point guard in 1965, while playing for the University of Illinois. That year, he was drafted 12th in the NBA draft. Before the NBA season started, he traveled to Israel, where he led the American team to a gold medal in the 1965 Maccabiah Games. Convinced by Moshe Dayan and others, to return to Israel to help elevate the country's basketball team and morale, he passed up his NBA career, to instead play basketball for Maccabi Tel Aviv.

In 1977, he led Maccabi Tel Aviv to the FIBA European Champions Cup (now called EuroLeague) championship. Along the way, his team defeated the heavily favored Soviet Red Army team, CSKA Moscow. Brody's famous remark upon beating the Soviets – "We are on the map! And we are staying on the map – not only in sports, but in everything." – became a part of Israeli culture. It has been used for decades, in various contexts, from political speeches, to National Lottery commercials.

== Early life ==
Brody is Jewish, and the son of Max and Shirley Brody. His father and paternal grandfather had emigrated from Eastern Europe to the United States, spending years in Mandatory Palestine, along the way. His father immigrated from Poland to Mandatory Palestine and lived there for three years in the 1920s, working as an engineer on the construction of the Rothenberg electric station, the country's first. Both his father and his grandfather, who lived in Mandatory Palestine for 10 years, helped build the country's first airfield, in Herzliya. Brody has an older sister, Renee.

He was born and raised in Trenton, New Jersey. Brody started playing basketball at age 8, in the Biddy Basketball League of the Trenton Jewish Community Center (JCC), in the Police Athletic League (PAL), and in the local Boys Club League.

He then attended Trenton Central High School. There, he was a New Jersey high school basketball All Star, selected to the First Team All-State Team, by The Star-Ledger in his senior year, and led his undefeated 24–0 team to a state championship. He graduated in 1961. Asked by his yearbook what he wanted to be in his life, he said that he would like to become either a professional basketball player, or an FBI agent.

== College career ==
Over 40 colleges approached Brody with scholarship offers. The Temple University Owls head coach Harry Litwak, in recruiting him, tried to dissuade him from going to powerhouse University of Illinois, suggesting that at the large school he would be "a small fish in a big pond". Conceding that the university was in fact a big one, Brody nevertheless told the coach that he liked the challenge of trying to be "a big fish" in a big pond.

Brody attended the University of Illinois. On the social side, he joined Zeta Beta Tau, the campus Jewish fraternity. The basketball-focused Brody would sleep with his basketball, and dribble it to class. At the time, freshmen were not allowed to play on the varsity basketball team, but as a sophomore he replaced the just-graduated Jerry Colangelo.

Brody was an outstanding 1.87 m (6'1 3/4") tall basketball star for the Illini, playing point guard while wearing uniform # 12. He was quick, slick, smart, and an excellent shooter and passer. His team won the Big Ten Championship, and was rated the number three team in the nation.

He was voted a 1965 All-American, along with fellow college basketball players like Rick Barry, Bill Bradley, and Billy Cunningham. He was also named first team All-Big Ten, a second team academic All American, and a Converse top-10 player. The Sporting News picked him as one of the top 10 players in the nation, along with Bradley, Barry, Cunningham, and Jerry Sloan. In 1965, he graduated from Illinois with a bachelor's degree in physical education. As of 2008, Brody was still ranked 33rd among the all-time scorers in Illinois history.

== NBA draft and Maccabiah Games (1965) ==
Brody was picked 12th in the 1965 National Basketball Association Draft by the Baltimore Bullets, known today as the Washington Wizards. That June he trained in a one-week Bullets rookie camp, and the team deemed him one of the best players. After the camp, the Bullets provided him with an apartment in Baltimore.

He traveled to Israel for the first time in August, with the Bullets' permission and his parents' blessing. There, he played for the USA team in the 1965 Maccabiah Games, the international Jewish Olympics. He led the team to a gold medal, as he played alongside Ronald Green, Steve Chubin, and Ron Watts.

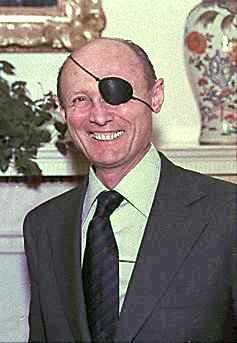
Moshe Dayan

Immediately after the Maccabiah Games, he was approached by managers of the Israeli Maccabi Tel Aviv basketball team. They asked him to join the team, in order to help elevate Israeli basketball to a higher level. Others joined in asking Brody to stay in Israel after the tournament, including the iconic eye-patch-wearing Israeli general Moshe Dayan, the Israeli Minister of Sports, and Ministry of Education officials. At that point, the Israeli team had never survived past the first round in the FIBA European Champions Cup (EuroLeague) competition.

Israel, as Brody put it, had opened his eyes. He had never previously traveled anywhere outside the U.S. Before he arrived in Israel, all he knew about it was what he had studied in Hebrew school. To his surprise, rather than arriving in Biblical Israel (with people riding camels and living in tents), he found himself in a modern society in which for the first time he met Jews from around the globe. The experience was a culture shock, and he was attracted to the culture and the everyday life. It changed the NBA-bound basketball player's goals in life. Eventually, because he was Jewish he agreed to take up the challenge and stay. His decision completely changed Israeli basketball.

Brody first returned to the United States, however, and completed his master's degree in educational psychology at Illinois. In August 1966, the NBA's St. Louis Hawks traded a veteran guard and a draft pick to the Bullets for the rights to Brody, but Brody chose to play basketball in Israel rather than in the NBA.

== Early Israeli basketball career (1966–69) ==
Brody returned to Israel in 1966 to "take up that challenge", help an entire country rather than just one team, and take one year out of his life to play for Maccabi Tel Aviv. He felt he could do something "special". Ralph Klein, Israel's most successful coach at the time, said that up until the enthusiastic Brody's arrival, Israelis had only viewed basketball as a fun game. But within a year, with his serious attitude and his inspirational commitment, Brody had inculcated his teammates with his view of basketball as a way of life. At his urging, the team doubled the number of practices it held every week.

To capitalize on Brody's quickness and speed, his coach abandoned the team's formerly slow pace in favor of a fast-paced motion game, built around fast breaks. Brody was the most dominant player in Europe's second-tier competition, the FIBA European Cup Winners Cup (FIBA Saporta Cup), in the 1966–67 season. In 1967, he was named Israel's Sportsman of the Year. The team made it through the first, second, and third rounds of the league playoffs, and reached the FIBA European Cup Winners Cup Finals, finishing second in the league.

For the first time, the Israeli Prime Minister (Levi Eshkol), the Israel Defense Forces Chief of Staff, and Knesset members came to games. Demand for tickets to games in the team's 5,000-seat stadium was so high that they became exceedingly difficult to obtain. In his down time, Brody coached Israeli soldiers when they were off duty from guarding Israel's border against its Arab neighbors. The experience, and the excitement Brody generated, made a deep impression on him. He had a vision of what he could accomplish, and saw the positive impact on the Israeli people's morale whenever Maccabi Tel Aviv beat a team in Europe. As he put it: "I felt it was bigger than me, and had to be continued, because I saw what the results were."

He had initially intended to help Israeli basketball for only one year. But that one year, and the excitement it generated (while at the same time, in the days preceding the June 1967 Six-Day War, Egypt and Syria were threatening to push the Israelis into the sea), pulled Brody into a second year. As the war was about to break out, the U.S. State Department sent him a telegram advising him to leave Israel. Instead of heeding the advice, he volunteered his services to lead Israeli soldiers at the Jordanian border in athletic exercises, as he stayed in Israel through the war.

== U.S. military service (1968–70) ==
Brody returned to the U.S. in 1968, to fulfill his military duty during the Vietnam War. He first took "Advanced Infantry Preparation for Vietnam". He then played for two years for the U.S. Army and United States Armed Forces All Star Teams as a starting guard, while Israelis worried over the impact of his departure. He also played for the USA Men's National Basketball Team, which finished fifth at the 1970 FIBA World Championship in Belgrade, Yugoslavia, in May 1970. During that championship competition, he received a letter from Moshe Dayan, who asked him to return to Israel.

== Israel military service (1970–73) ==
After the United States military released him, Brody returned to Israel to live. He made aliyah and became an Israeli citizen towards the end of 1970. The Israeli government called him up to its military that year, and he served in the Israeli Army. Later, as a reserve in the Israel Defense Forces, he was tasked with supporting the Israeli Air Force, in which his son Ron later served.

== Later Israeli basketball career (1973–80) ==
At the 27-country 1973 Maccabiah Games, dedicated to the 11 Israeli athletes killed in the Munich Massacre at the 1972 Olympics, he was captain of the Israeli basketball team and given the honor of lighting the opening torch. He led the national team to a gold medal, as they beat a U.S. team led by Ernie Grunfeld in the finals.

Brody played for Maccabi Tel Aviv until 1980. He won ten Israeli League championships with the team, and six Israel State Cups, in what has been described as a "stellar" and "amazing" career. With Maccabi Tel Aviv, he appeared in 81 FIBA European Champions Cup (now called EuroLeague) games, scoring 1,378 points. Brody was also selected to the FIBA European Selection (European All-Star Team). In the Israeli Super League, Brody scored 4,049 points, in 211 games.

Brody also played for the senior Israel national team, scoring 1,219 points in 78 games. With that, he played on national basketball teams of both the U.S. and Israel, and served in the armies of both countries. When the Israeli Omri Casspi, was drafted in the first round of the 2009 NBA draft, by the Sacramento Kings, to play in the U.S., Brody called it "the completion of a circle".

=== The FIBA European Champions Cup Championship; "We are on the map!" ===
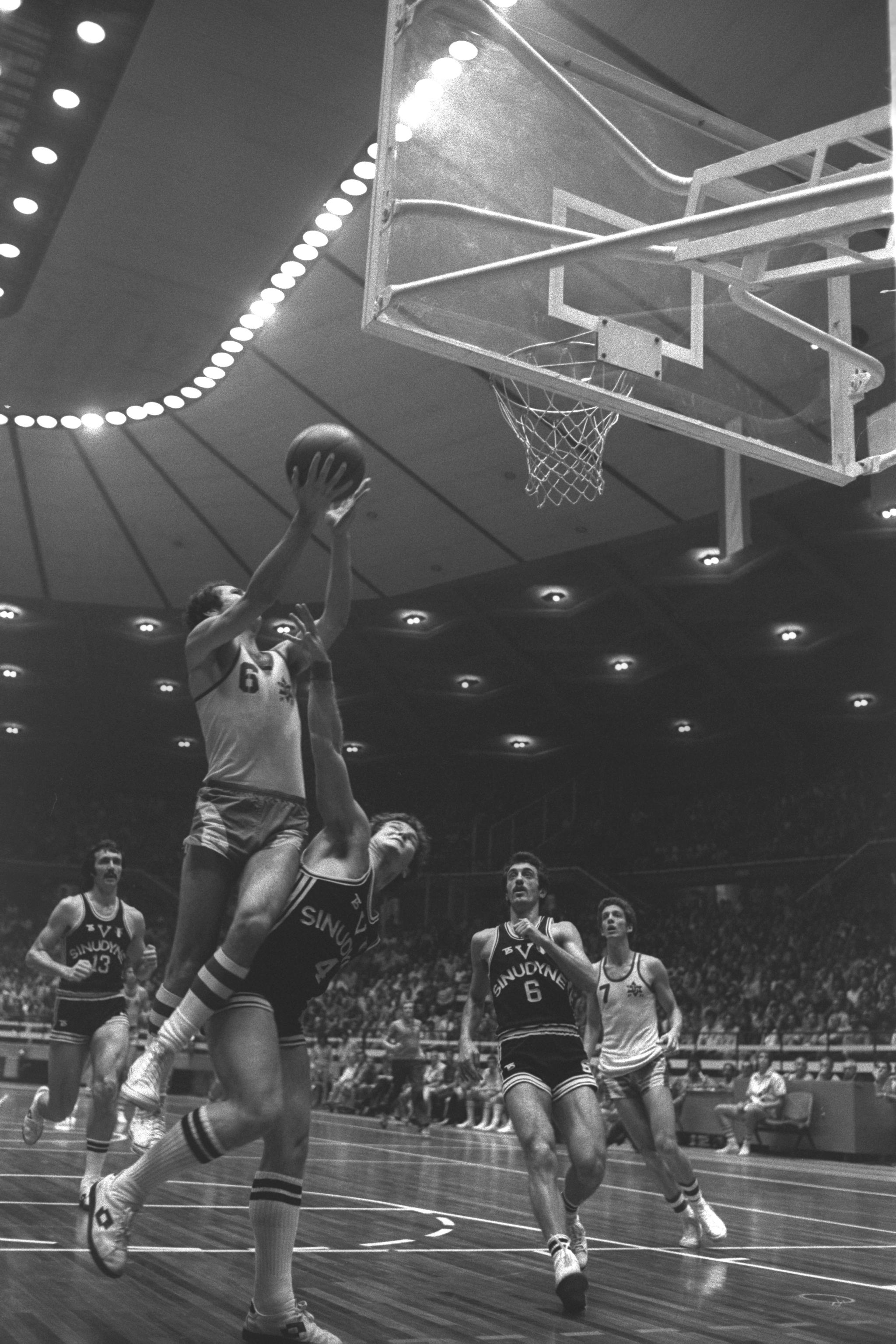
Brody drives to the hoop for a layup during a game

The highlight of his career came in 1977. It was the apex of the Cold War, and the Soviet Union was boycotting Israel. In the first round of the European-wide top-tier level FIBA European Champions Cup (later renamed to EuroLeague), Maccabi Tel Aviv defeated Real Madrid, of Spain's top league, 94–85. In the second round, it beat Zbrojovka Brno, of Czechoslovakia's top-tier league, for the first time, 91–76, on February 15, 1977.

In the FIBA European Champions Cup 1976–77 season semifinals, Maccabi Tel Aviv was matched against CSKA Moscow—the Red Army team. CSKA Moscow was a powerhouse. The Soviet Army team had won the prior USSR Premier League basketball title. Six of its players had played on the Soviet national team that had controversially defeated the United States in the 1972 Summer Olympics, and their captain was Sergei Belov (who years later recalled that Brody was one of his toughest opponents). And the Communists were well known for using sports to glorify what they billed as their supremacy over the West.

The Soviet Union had broken off diplomatic relations with Israel a decade earlier, and politically and militarily backed Israel's Arab enemies. For political reasons, therefore, CSKA Moscow refused to play in Tel Aviv (which would have resulted in a technical defeat). And the Soviets also refused to grant visas to the Israelis, to allow them to come play in Moscow. In the end, Maccabi Tel Aviv's "home game" was played in the small, neutral town of Virton, Belgium.

The game took place in an emotional and politically charged atmosphere. It was of huge symbolic value for Maccabi Tel Aviv fans, and for many Israelis who ordinarily had no interest in basketball. The game pitted the capitalist West against the Communist East, and Israel against the country that was supplying its enemies with weapons. The game also matched the country of Israel, with a total of a mere 4 million inhabitants, against the Soviets, with their 290 million people. The newspaper Maariv billed the February 17, 1977, game as "the fight between David and Goliath." Most of Israel's population watched the game, which was broadcast on Israel's only TV channel at the time.

Maccabi Tel Aviv upset the heavily favored Soviets, 91–79. Enthusiastic fans carried Brody off the court on their shoulders. The feeling among Israelis was not only that CSKA Moscow had been defeated, but that a victory – albeit small – had been achieved against the mighty Soviet Union. The game has for decades been recognized as a key event in the forging of Israel's national identity. Even decades later, it was being replayed repeatedly on Israeli television.

"We are on the map!" proclaimed an elated, euphoric Brody in his heavily American-accented Hebrew, as a TV announcer pushed a microphone in front of him for a post-game quote, while people danced the hora around him in excitement and celebration. "And we are staying on the map – not only in sports, but in everything."

The remark was spontaneous, and unprepared. As Brody put it, it just "came out of my heart, at that instant." Then-Prime Minister Yitzhak Rabin called Brody into his office, and told him that Brody's statement had brought tears to his eyes, and had immeasurably impacted the Israeli people's morale.

The phrase "We are on the map!" ("anachnu bamapa, ve'anahnu nisharim bamapa!"), a literal translation of an English phrase into his adopted language, but a novel saying in Hebrew, became a new, popular phrase in Israel. It reflected a physical victory by the nascent Jewish Zionist idea, and national pride. It became Israel's most famous quote. The phrase was as significant for Israelis as U.S. astronaut Neil Armstrong's statement – "One small step for man; one giant step for mankind" – had been for Americans, vis-a-vis the space age.

The saying became a staple of Israeli speech. Israeli Prime Minister Menachem Begin co-opted the phrase as an election campaign slogan in 1981. It was also used by former Soviet refusenik and Israeli Yisrael BaAliyah party leader and Industry and Trade Minister Natan Sharansky, in 1998. The Israeli National Lottery Board spoofed it in a television commercial, in which a winning racehorse with an American accent stated: "We are on the racetrack, and we will stay on the racetrack." Similarly, when Israel's Davis Cup team beat the powerhouse Russian Davis Cup team in a shocking victory in the 2009 Davis Cup tennis quarter-finals, Prime Minister Netanyahu telephoned the Israel Tennis Association Director General and echoed Brody's statement of over three decades earlier, saying: "We're back on the map".

Back home, hundreds of thousands of Israelis celebrated spontaneously in the streets, and 150,000 in Tel Aviv congregated in celebration in what is now Rabin Square. Many jumped into its fountain, splashing in water and champagne. Recalling the moment, an Israeli quoted in the book From Beirut to Jerusalem told Thomas Friedman that on one level it was Brody the star basketball player and his teammates beating the Russians, but on another level it was "my grandfather beating them. It was our retroactive victory over the Cossacks." Brody was credited with being so inspiring that basketball became Israel's number one sport, surpassing soccer.

The FIBA European Champions Cup finals were played in Belgrade, Yugoslavia, on April 7, 1977. Yugoslavia was a Communist country, with which Israel did not have diplomatic relations, and the El Al plane that brought the Maccabi Tel Aviv players over to it for the game was the first Israeli plane ever allowed to land there. The Israelis were pitted against the highly favored Mobilgirgi Varese, the champions of Italy's top league. Mobilgirgi Varese had beaten the Israelis twice that year, and had beaten them in the European-wide second-tier level FIBA European Cup Winners' Cup finals ten years earlier, when Brody first started playing for Maccabi Tel Aviv. Back in Israel, the entire country watched the game on television.

Maccabi Tel Aviv went on to defeat Mobilgirgi Varese by one point, 78–77, in the FIBA European Champions Cup Finals. Brody, as the team captain, received the European Cup trophy from FIBA's Secretary General, and lifted it over his head.

It was Israel's first FIBA European Champions Cup basketball championship in the 23-nation league. It was also the first time that Israel had won a championship of that caliber in any sport, and was, at the time, Israel's greatest achievement in international sports. The victory greatly lifted the spirit and morale of the country. In Israel, 200,000 people gathered to celebrate in Israel's National Park, and the event was celebrated as a national holiday. When the team returned home, it found 150,000 Israelis waiting for it. Brody himself became widely known as an Israeli national hero, and as a symbol of Israel's achievements.

In 1978, the team was also a semi-finalist in the 1977–78 FIBA European Champions Cup basketball competition. When Brody retired from basketball in 1980, a special official retirement game was arranged in his honor, and the FIBA European Selection All-Star Team arrived in Israel, to play against Maccabi Tel Aviv.

=== Pro basketball career accomplishments ===
- FIBA Saporta Cup Finals Top Scorer: (1967)
- Israeli Sportsman of the Year: (1967)
- 10× Israeli League Champion: (1967, 1968, 1973, 1974, 1975, 1976, 1977, 1978, 1979, 1980)
- 6× Israeli State Cup Winner: (1973, 1975, 1977, 1978, 1979, 1980)
- EuroLeague champion: (1977)
- FIBA European Selection: (1978)
- Israel Prize: (1979)
- 101 Greats of European Basketball: (2018)

=== Professional career scoring statistics ===
Competition	Games Played	Points Scored	Scoring Average	Ref.
Israeli League	211	4,049	19.2	
EuroLeague	81	1,378	17.0	
FIBA International Competitions (Israel National Team)	78	1,219	15.6	

== Honors ==
Brody became the first sportsman to be awarded the Israel Prize, Israel's highest civilian honor, in 1979. It was presented to him by Israeli President Yitzhak Navon, in recognition of his unique contribution to Israeli society and the State in the field of sports. The Israel Prize Committee noted that he was "an excellent athlete who set an outstanding example" for Israeli immigrants and absorption.

During his basketball career, he was also twice named Israeli Basketball Player of the Year. In 1988 he was voted the Israeli athlete who most influenced Israeli sports, in a poll by the Israeli newspaper Ma'ariv. In 1996, he was elected the University of Illinois "Man of the Year", in recognition of his sports and other accomplishments, and awarded the school's "I" Award for his achievements.

In 2004, he was given the honor of lighting a torch at the 56th Israeli Independence Day ceremony on Mount Herzl. His team Maccabi Tel Aviv was the first non-U.S. basketball team to be honored at the Naismith Basketball Hall of Fame, in a special exhibition in 2008. In 2025 he was awarded the President’s Global Leadership Award from the International Jewish Sports Hall of Fame.

In Israel, Brody is renown as a national hero. He is compared with similarity to that of Michael Jordan in the United States. Some people view him as a renown athlete to have ever represented Israel. As Israel's first modern-day sports hero, he is a symbol of all the young country's achievements, and not only its successes in basketball. He is known by the nicknames: "Mr. Basketball", and "The man who put Israel on the Map".

=== Halls of Fame ===
In 1996, Brody was inducted into the International Jewish Sports Hall of Fame, and in March 2011 he was inducted into the U.S. National Jewish Sports Hall of Fame. He was also inducted into the Israeli Basketball Hall of Fame. In 2023, Brody was inducted into the Philadelphia Jewish Sports Hall of Fame.

He represented Maccabi Tel Aviv as it became the first non-U.S. basketball team to be honored at the Naismith Basketball Hall of Fame, in a special exhibition in 2008 entitled "Putting Israel on the Map". However, despite being nominated numerous times, he has yet to be inducted.

== Life after playing basketball ==
=== Basketball-related ===
After he retired as a player, Brody continued with Maccabi Tel Aviv as an assistant coach. He was on the team's Board of Directors until 2007, when Netanyahu approached him with regard to entering politics.

In addition, he has been Maccabi Tel Aviv's volunteer liaison with the National Basketball Association since 1988, helping organize games between Maccabi Tel Aviv and various NBA teams.

Brody was also a sports commentator for Israeli television in the early 1990s. He in addition became an instructor at the Wingate Institute of Physical Fitness in Netanya. Brody serves as well on the Board of Directors of the Maccabi World Union (MWU), which organizes the Maccabiah Games in Israel. He was also appointed to serve on a panel of experts who select recipients of the Israel Prize for athletics.

Brody was featured in a 2008 documentary entitled The Jewish Basketball Hall of Fame, Volume 1, produced by Yisrael Lifschutz. He was also featured in a book by the title: A Voice Called; Stories of Jewish Heroism, by Yossi Katz, which was published in 2010.

=== Business career ===
After retiring from playing basketball, Brody established, and was chief executive officer and a co-owner of, a sporting goods export/import/distribution business named Sports United Ltd. At the same time, he ran basketball clinics across Israel. He ultimately sold the sporting goods business to his partner.

Brody also was appointed the local agent of Japanese consumer goods company Mitsuboshi C.I. Co., and was elected to the Japan-Israel Chamber of Commerce Board of Directors.

He then entered the insurance business. Brody established, owned, and managed an independent insurance firm named Tal Brody Insurance Agency in Tel Aviv. The company handled pension programs, provident funds, and health and education funds for 20 years. He ultimately sold the business in 2008. He has since retired from the business world, which he calls the second stage of his life.

=== Philanthropy ===
Since retiring from basketball, Brody has initiated, volunteered for, and assisted a number of charitable organizations and efforts.

He created an after-school program for Israeli children, called "Let's Play Ball!" As part of the program, he coaches basketball and gives basketball clinics to schoolchildren, members of kibbutzim, residents of development towns, and soldiers in the Israeli army. The program has impacted over 200,000 children.

He is also Chairman of the Spirit of Israel (JAFI), a non-profit Jewish Agency subsidiary that he created in 1999. It raises money from the Israeli public to help underprivileged Israeli children and others, by providing for their "vital human needs" (as defined by the Jewish Agency and Keren Hayesod). He arrived at the idea for the charity when he attended a meeting at which efforts to raise money in the U.S. for Israel were being discussed. Brody began to muse about what Israelis were doing for themselves on the charity front. As a result, he established the Spirit of Israel to raise money within Israel for Israelis. Projects included assisting Israeli senior citizens, "at risk" children, and family abuse victims.

Brody is also Sports Ambassador for Migdal Ohr and the America–Israel Friendship League (AIFL). Migdal Ohr helps at-risk, disadvantaged, impoverished, orphaned, and underprivileged Israeli children of all religions. He helped organize and promote an exhibition game between Maccabi Tel Aviv and the New York Knicks in the U.S., with all proceeds going to benefit Migdal Ohr.

In 1985, Brody joined with Herzliya and its Mayor (Eli Landau) to construct and run one of the world's largest basketball schools, designing a unique program with specially chosen coaches. The school is Bnei Herzliya. The basketball school is now run by the municipality of Herzliya, with Brody serving as its president. It provides a basketball program to 14,000 children from ages 5–18, drawn from 14 citywide schools.

Brody also has spoken around the world for the Israeli Foreign Ministry, and for American Jewish organizations.

=== Political career (2008) ===
Brody was asked to join Yitzhak Yitzhaky's One Israel party in 1980, after he retired. But he rejected the offer. He did not view himself as a politician, and was not seeking a political career. Though he joined the Likud party in the 1990s, he was not openly active in politics because he did not believe that an active sportsman should involve himself in politics.

When Likud party chairman Benjamin Netanyahu approached him personally, however, and asked him to step forward for the country, Brody for the first time considered entering politics. Netanyahu was interested in involving people who had not formerly entered into politics. Brody found it difficult to turn away Netanyahu, who impressed upon him that it would be important to Israel for Brody to run for office. Netanyahu suggested that Brody could more effectively push the advances he was already seeking, in education, sports, immigration, absorption, and social issues, if he were a member of the Israeli Knesset.

Brody announced in August 2007 that he was seriously considering running for the Knesset in the general election, as a Likud candidate. He said in November 2008 that he felt that it was the appropriate point in his life to change careers, after having spent much of his life first playing basketball and then heading an insurance agency that managed employment benefits programs for companies. He noted that the Knesset would be a third career calling for him, as long as it allowed him to concentrate on those areas that were already his focus, such as sports, education, aliyah, the Diaspora, Israeli-American relations, and helping children who are "at risk", and that he saw it as a good way to spend the third phase of his life after basketball and business. He stressed that in his view it was not politics, but rather "good citizenship". But he acknowledged that when he discussed his goals with Netanyahu, the Prime Minister had replied that "in the Knesset, they call it politics."

Brody ran for a national slot (places 2–19 on Likud's list), to represent the district between Tel Aviv and Haifa, along the Israeli coast. He became the fourth candidate who was formerly a resident of the U.S., and was supported by Likud Anglos, Likud's English-speaking division. In a November 2008 press conference Brody and Netanyahu held, Brody said: "We need to change the situation in the country. 70% of the people think there is corruption in politics." Netanyahu introduced Brody as his future Minister of Sports and Culture. Among other things, Brody noted that Israel's amateur sports budget had declined from $35 million a year to $10 million a year, and suggested that the budget could be supplemented by working with the NBA or the National Football League. He also had in mind the creation of a sports program with Birthright Israel Taglit to encourage aliyah. Endorsed by Netanyahu, he said that whether he won or lost, at least he would feel that he did all he could to answer Netanyahu's request that candidates with varied abilities and life experiences run for the Knesset. He joked, however, that if he were to win, he looked forward to playing basketball against President Obama, who is an intense basketball fan.

In the December 2008 Likud primaries, however, he was not elected to Likud's list of candidates. Danny Danon, the well-organized chairman of World Likud—who was backed by Zo Artzeinu co-founder Moshe Feiglin—beat him in what turned out to be an intense fight for the slot on the Likud list. Remarking on his feelings about the primaries, Brody said that he had only become involved in the political process because he thought it was the obligation of people to come forward to serve the country, but that his involvement in the process had made him aware of the fact that many local voters rely on the "professional politicians" for jobs.

=== Goodwill Ambassador (2010–present) ===
Prime Minister Netanyahu asked Brody in early 2009 to help Israel in a yet-to-be-created official position of goodwill ambassador for the country. In July 2010, Israeli Deputy Prime Minister and Foreign Minister Avigdor Lieberman appointed Brody as the first international Goodwill Ambassador for Israel, to assist with Israel's international diplomacy. In that unpaid position—the only money he receives is compensation for his expenses—he speaks to audiences outside of Israel about Israel's culture, sports, and successes, and Israelis' daily lives.

His trips outside Israel are coordinated by the Israeli Foreign Ministry and by Israel's embassies and consulates. He speaks at schools, universities, Jewish and non-Jewish organizations and community centers, synagogues, Christian events, African-American organizations, and fundraising events. While he seeks to encourage those people who support Israel, a major focus of his—which accords with a suggestion he was given by Harvard Law Professor Alan Dershowitz—is on those people who are undecided about Israel. His discussions with groups outside of Israel have touched on the tension between terrorism and restrictions on freedom of movement, Israel's security fence, Israel's Black Ethiopian Jews, and the role of Israeli Arabs in Israeli society. Brody said that he took on the role because it was what he wanted to do—serve the State of Israel.

In May 2015, Brody was presented with a Lifetime Achievement Award for his outstanding contribution to shaping and helping Israel through sports and dedicated hasbara (public diplomacy) efforts at a Nefesh B'Nefesh Bonei Zion 2015 Prizes special ceremony at the Knesset hosted by Knesset Member Tzachi Hanegbi.

== Personal life ==
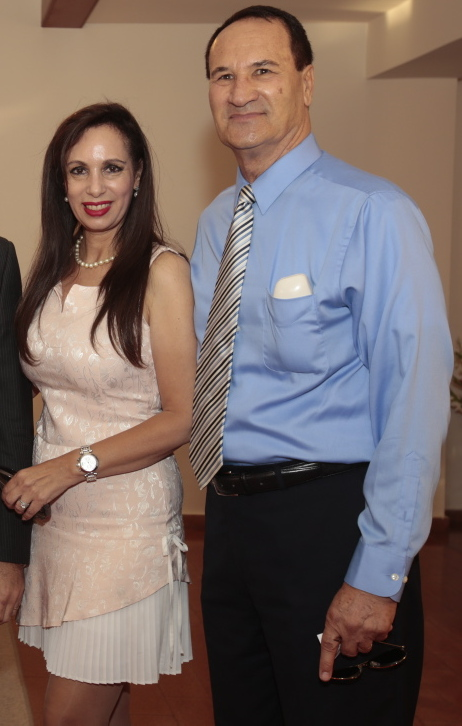
Tal Brody with his wife Tirtza in 2015

After Brody returned to Israel in 1970, he married a 20-year-old Israeli woman, Ronit Born, in a wedding that Defense Minister Moshe Dayan attended as his guest of honor. The two were married for 14 years. Brody and his second wife Tirtza, whom he married in the early 1980s, live in Netanya in Israel. He has three children (two from his first marriage (Ron and Kareen), and a daughter Linor from his second wife's first marriage), and five grandchildren.

His American-accented Hebrew is the result of his not having formally studied the language when he arrived in Israel—as he thought his stay would be a temporary one, rather than a decades-long one. He instead picked up the language from colloquial use. His Hebrew consequently remains a source of amusement in Israel, and has been humorously targeted by friends and family, as well as by Eretz Nehederet, Israel's version of Saturday Night Live.

== See also ==
- List of Israel Prize recipients
- List of select Jewish basketball players
