= 1964–65 Wisconsin Badgers men's basketball team =

American college basketball season

1964–65 Wisconsin Badgers men's basketball
- Conference: Big Ten Conference
- Record: 9–13 (4–10 Big Ten)
- Head coach: John Erickson
- Home arena: UW Fieldhouse

1964–65 Big Ten Conference men's basketball standings
	Conf.				Overall
Team	W		L	PCT	W		L	PCT
No. 1 Michigan	13	–	1	.929	24	–	4	.857
No. 7 Minnesota	11	–	3	.786	19	–	5	.792
Illinois	10	–	4	.714	18	–	6	.750
Indiana	9	–	5	.643	19	–	5	.792
Iowa	8	–	6	.571	14	–	10	.583
Ohio State	6	–	8	.429	12	–	12	.500
Purdue	5	–	9	.357	12	–	12	.500
Wisconsin	4	–	10	.286	9	–	13	.409
Northwestern	3	–	11	.214	7	–	17	.292
Michigan State	1	–	13	.071	5	–	18	.217
Rankings from AP Poll

The 1964–65 Wisconsin Badgers men's basketball team represented University of Wisconsin–Madison. The head coach was John Erickson, coaching his sixth season with the Badgers. The team played their home games at the UW Fieldhouse in Madison, Wisconsin and was a member of the Big Ten Conference.

== Schedule ==
Date time, TV	Rank^{#}	Opponent^{#}	Result	Record	Site city, state
Regular Season
12/01/1964*		Houston	W 76–65	1–0	UW Fieldhouse; Madison, Wisconsin
12/08/1964*		at Pittsburgh	W 80–63	2–0	Fitzgerald Field House; Pittsburgh
12/12/1964*		Bowling Green	W 87–56	3–0	UW Fieldhouse; Madison, Wisconsin
12/15/1964		Illinois	L 56–70	3–1 (0–1)	UW Fieldhouse; Madison, Wisconsin
12/18/1964*		vs. Boston College; Milwaukee Classic	L 85–86	3–2	Milwaukee Arena; Milwaukee
12/19/1964*		vs. Marquette; Milwaukee Classic	L 61–62	3–3	Milwaukee Arena; Milwaukee
12/26/1964*		vs. Boston College; Rainbow Classic	W 70–69	4–3	Honolulu International Center; Honolulu
1/04/1965*		at Iowa	L 62–92	4–4 (0–2)	Iowa Field House; Iowa City, Iowa
01/09/1965		at Minnesota	L 57–81	4–5 (0–3)	Williams Arena; Minneapolis
1/11/1965		Purdue	W 76–66	5–5 (1–3)	UW Fieldhouse; Madison, Wisconsin
1/13/1965*		Marquette	L 58–59	5–6	UW Fieldhouse; Madison, Wisconsin
1/30/1965		at Ohio State	L 86–98	5–7 (1–4)	St. John Arena; Columbus, Ohio
2/01/1965*		at Notre Dame	W 98–90	6–7	Notre Dame Fieldhouse; Notre Dame, Indiana
2/06/1965		Ohio State	L 71–73	6–8 (1–5)	UW Fieldhouse; Madison, Wisconsin
2/13/1965		at Purdue	L 74–83	6–9 (1–6)	Lambert Fieldhouse; West Lafayette, Indiana
2/16/1965		No. 9 Minnesota	L 91–101	6–10 (1–7)	UW Fieldhouse; Madison, Wisconsin
2/20/1965		at No. 7 Indiana	L 87–101	6–11 (1–8)	New Fieldhouse; Bloomington, Indiana
2/23/1965		Northwestern	W 93–87 ^{OT}	7–11 (2–8)	UW Fieldhouse; Madison, Wisconsin
2/27/1965		Michigan State	W 99–89	8–11 (3–8)	UW Fieldhouse; Madison, Wisconsin
3/02/1965		at No. 1 Michigan	L 75–98	8–12 (3–9)	Yost Field House; Ann Arbor, Michigan
3/06/1965		at Northwestern	W 88–76	9–12 (4–9)	Welsh-Ryan Arena; Evanston, Illinois
3/08/1965		Indiana	L 73–92	9–13 (4–10)	UW Fieldhouse; Madison, Wisconsin
*Non-conference game. ^{#}Rankings from AP Poll. (#) Tournament seedings in parentheses.
