= One Israel (1980) =

One Israel ישראל אחת
- Leader: Yitzhak Yitzhaky
- Founded: 11 November 1980
- Split from: Likud
- Most MKs: 1 (1980–1981)
- Fewest MKs: 1 (1980–1981)

Election symbol
- ט

One Israel (Hebrew: ישראל אחת, Yisrael Ahat) was a short-lived political party in Israel led by Yitzhak Yitzhaky.

== Background ==
The formation of One Israel during the ninth Knesset was largely precipitated by Menachem Begin's controversial decision to sign the Camp David Accords and the Egypt–Israel peace treaty despite opposition within his own party, Likud. Internal disagreements led to seven MKs deserting the party in 1980 (though one later returned).

Three set up Rafi – National List, two founded Tehiya and Yosef Tamir defected to Shinui. On 10 October 1980 Yitzhak Yitzhaky also left the party, despite only having joined the Likud during the Knesset session, having been elected on the Shlomtzion list (which had merged into Likud soon after the election). Yitzhaky was initially an independent, but formed One Israel on 11 November.

Yitzhaky asked American-Israeli basketball legend Tal Brody to join the party, but was rebuffed. Its list for the 1981 elections was headed by Yitzhaky, with Sara Smilansky in third place. The party received only 0.2% of the vote, failing to cross the 1% electoral threshold, and later disappeared.
