= Shlomtzion (political party) =

Shlomtzion שלומציון
- Leader: Ariel Sharon
- Founded: 1976
- Merged into: Likud
- Ideology: Liberal conservatism Liberal Zionism
- Political position: Centre-right
- Most MKs: 2 (1977)

Election symbol
- כנ

Shlomtzion (Hebrew: שלומציון, a contraction of Shalom-Zion, or Peace-Zion, punning on the Hebrew name of Israel's only regnant queen in history) was a political party in Israel. Founded by Ariel Sharon in 1977 prior to elections that year, it merged into Likud immediately after the Knesset term began.

== Background ==
During the 1940s and 1950s, Sharon was a supporter of Mapai, the dominant left-wing party in Israel, and the predecessor of the modern Labor Party. However, he was instrumental in establishing Likud in July 1973 by uniting most of the right-wing parties in the country; Gahal, the Free Centre, the National List and the Movement for Greater Israel. Sharon was elected to the Knesset in the December 1973 elections on Likud's list, but retired from the Knesset just under a year later.

From June 1975 to March 1976, Sharon was a special aide to Alignment Prime Minister Yitzhak Rabin. However, with the 1977 elections looming, Sharon tried to return to the Likud and replace Menachem Begin at the head of the party. He suggested to Simkha Erlikh, who headed the Liberal Party bloc in the Likud, that he was more fitting than Begin to win an election victory, but he was rejected. Following this he tried to join the Alignment and then the centrist Dash, but was turned down by both.

After his triple snub, Sharon resorted to forming his own party, Shlomtzion. The new party won two seats in the election, taken by Sharon and Yitzhak Yitzhaky. However, the party ceased to exist when it merged into Likud on 5 July 1977, and Sharon was made Minister of Agriculture. In 1980, Yitzhaky broke away from Likud to form his own party, One Israel.
