= 1964–65 Indiana Hoosiers men's basketball team =

American college basketball season

1964–65 Indiana Hoosiers men's basketball
- Conference: Big Ten Conference

Ranking
- Coaches: No. 18
- Record: 19–5 (9–5 Big Ten)
- Head coach: Branch McCracken (24th season)
- Assistant coaches: Lou Watson; Don Luft
- Captains: Jon McGlocklin; Al Harden
- Home arena: New Fieldhouse

1964–65 Big Ten Conference men's basketball standings
	Conf.				Overall
Team	W		L	PCT	W		L	PCT
No. 1 Michigan	13	–	1	.929	24	–	4	.857
No. 7 Minnesota	11	–	3	.786	19	–	5	.792
Illinois	10	–	4	.714	18	–	6	.750
Indiana	9	–	5	.643	19	–	5	.792
Iowa	8	–	6	.571	14	–	10	.583
Ohio State	6	–	8	.429	12	–	12	.500
Purdue	5	–	9	.357	12	–	12	.500
Wisconsin	4	–	10	.286	9	–	13	.409
Northwestern	3	–	11	.214	7	–	17	.292
Michigan State	1	–	13	.071	5	–	18	.217
Rankings from AP Poll

The 1964–65 Indiana Hoosiers men's basketball team represented Indiana University in the Big Ten Conference. Their head coach was Branch McCracken, who was in his 24th and final year. The team played its home games on campus in New Fieldhouse in Bloomington.

The Hoosiers finished the regular season with an overall record of 19–5 and a conference record of 9–5, finishing 4th in the Big Ten. Indiana was not invited to participate in any postseason tournament. (In 1965, the NCAA tournament had 23 teams and the NIT had fourteen.)

== Roster ==
No.	Name	Position	Ht.	Year	Hometown
20	Gary Tofil	G	6–2	So.	Indianapolis, Indiana
22	Bill Russell	G	6–1	So.	Columbus, Indiana
23	Al Harden	G	5–10	Sr.	Covington, Indiana
24	Vern Pfaff	G	5–10	Jr.	Ellettsville, Indiana
25	Tom Van Arsdale	F	6–5	Sr.	Indianapolis, Indiana
30	Dick Van Arsdale	F	6–5	Sr.	Indianapolis, Indiana
32	Ron Peyser	C	6–8	Sr.	Chicago, Illinois
33	Jack Johnson	F	6–6	So.	Greenfield, Indiana
34	Dave Dickerson	F	6–4	So.	Paris, Illinois
35	Ron McMains	F	6–5	So.	Frankfort, Indiana
40	Larry Turpen	G	6–1	Jr.	Shawswick, Indiana
41	Max Walker	G	6–1	Jr.	Milwaukee, Wisconsin
42	Erv Inniger	G	6–3	So.	Berne, Indiana
43	Gary Grieger	F	6–4	Jr.	Evansville, Indiana
44	Steve Redenbaugh	G	6–2	Sr.	Paoli, Indiana
45	Larry Cooper	C	6–7	Sr.	Osborne, Kansas
54	Jon McGlocklin	F/C	6–5	Sr.	Franklin, Indiana

== Schedule/results ==
Date time, TV	Rank^{#}	Opponent^{#}	Result	Record	Site city, state
Regular season
12/1/1964*		Ohio	W 81–70	1–0	New Fieldhouse; Bloomington, IN
12/5/1964*		at No. 8 Kansas State	W 74–70	2–0	Ahearn Field House; Manhattan, KS
12/7/1964*		Oklahoma	W 87–69	3–0	New Fieldhouse; Bloomington, IN
12/12/1964*		North Carolina	W 107–81	4–0	New Fieldhouse; Bloomington, IN
12/14/1964*		DePaul	W 91–78	5–0	New Fieldhouse; Bloomington, IN
12/19/1964*		at Detroit	W 108–89	6–0	Calihan Hall; Detroit, MI
12/21/1964*		vs. Notre Dame	W 107–81	7–0	Memorial Coliseum; Fort Wayne, IN
12/28/1964*	No. 8	vs. Saint Louis; Memphis State Invitational	W 98–68	8–0	Memorial Fieldhouse; Memphis, TN
12/29/1964*	No. 7	at Memphis State; Memphis State Invitational	W 91–68	9–0	Memorial Fieldhouse; Memphis, TN
1/4/1965	No. 7	at No. 6 Illinois; Rivalry	L 81–86	9–1 (0–1)	Assembly Hall; Champaign, IL
1/9/1965	No. 2	Northwestern	W 86–73	10–1 (1–1)	New Fieldhouse; Bloomington, IN
1/11/1965	No. 2	at Iowa	W 85–76	11–1 (2–1)	Iowa Field House; Iowa City, IA
1/16/1965	No. 5	at Ohio State	W 84–72	12–1 (3–1)	St. John Arena; Columbus, OH
1/18/1965	No. 5	Iowa	L 68–74	12–2 (3–2)	New Fieldhouse; Bloomington, IN
2/4/1965*	No. 7	Loyola (Chicago)	W 109–82	13–2 (3–2)	New Fieldhouse; Bloomington, IN
2/8/1965	No. 7	Michigan State	W 112–94	14–2 (4–2)	New Fieldhouse; Bloomington, IN
2/13/1965		at Northwestern	W 86–76	15–2 (5–2)	Welsh-Ryan Arena; Evanston, IL
2/15/1965	No. 8	No. 1 Michigan	L 95–96 ^{OT}	15–3 (5–3)	New Fieldhouse; Bloomington, IN
2/20/1965	No. 7	Wisconsin	W 100–87	16–3 (6–3)	New Fieldhouse; Bloomington, IN
2/22/1965	No. 7	at Purdue; Rivalry	L 70–82	16–4 (6–4)	Lambert Fieldhouse; West Lafayette, IN
2/27/1965	No. 7	at No. 8 Minnesota	L 88–100	16–5 (6–5)	Williams Arena; Minneapolis, MN
3/1/1965	No. 7	Ohio State	W 110–90	17–5 (7–5)	New Fieldhouse; Bloomington, IN
3/6/1965		Purdue; Rivalry	W 90–79	18–5 (8–5)	New Fieldhouse; Bloomington, IN
3/8/1965		at Wisconsin	W 92–73	19–5 (9–5)	Wisconsin Field House; Madison, WI
*Non-conference game. ^{#}Rankings from AP Poll. (#) Tournament seedings in parentheses.
