= 1964–65 Iowa Hawkeyes men's basketball team =

American college basketball season

1964–65 Iowa Hawkeyes men's basketball
- Conference: Big Ten Conference
- Record: 14–10 (8–6 Big Ten)
- Head coach: Ralph Miller (1st season)
- Assistant coaches: Lanny Van Eman; Dick Schultz
- Home arena: Iowa Field House (Capacity: 13,365)

1964–65 Big Ten Conference men's basketball standings
	Conf.				Overall
Team	W		L	PCT	W		L	PCT
No. 1 Michigan	13	–	1	.929	24	–	4	.857
No. 7 Minnesota	11	–	3	.786	19	–	5	.792
Illinois	10	–	4	.714	18	–	6	.750
Indiana	9	–	5	.643	19	–	5	.792
Iowa	8	–	6	.571	14	–	10	.583
Ohio State	6	–	8	.429	12	–	12	.500
Purdue	5	–	9	.357	12	–	12	.500
Wisconsin	4	–	10	.286	9	–	13	.409
Northwestern	3	–	11	.214	7	–	17	.292
Michigan State	1	–	13	.071	5	–	18	.217
Rankings from AP Poll

The 1964–65 Iowa Hawkeyes men's basketball team represented the University of Iowa in intercollegiate basketball during the 1964–65 season. The team was led by first-year head coach Ralph Miller and played their home games at the Iowa Field House. The Hawkeyes finished the season 14–10 and were 8–6 in Big Ten conference games.

The team was 3–2 in games versus opponents ranked in the AP top five, including a neutral site win over No. 1 UCLA, the eventual national champion.

== Roster ==
1964–65 Iowa Hawkeyes men's basketball team
Players
Coaches

Pos.	#	Name	Height	Weight	Year	Hometown
F/C	10	Dick Agnew	—	—	Fr
G	11	Denny Pauling	6 ft 4 in (1.93 m)	—	Jr
G	13	Dave White	—	—	So
G	15	Jimmy Rodgers	6 ft 3 in (1.91 m)	—	Sr
F	23	Gerry Jones	6 ft 4 in (1.93 m)	—	So	Chicago, Illinois
G	25	Tom Chapman	6 ft 3 in (1.91 m)	—	So	Fort Dodge, Iowa
G	32	Chris Pervall	6 ft 2 in (1.88 m)	—	Jr
G	42	Rolly McGrath	6 ft 1 in (1.85 m)	—	Fr
F	44	Ben McGilmer	6 ft 7 in (2.01 m)	—	Fr
C	45	George Peeples	6 ft 7 in (2.01 m)	—	Jr
F	51	Huston Breedlove	6 ft 6 in (1.98 m)	—	Fr	Akron, Ohio
F	52	Gary Olson	6 ft 5 in (1.96 m)	—	Jr

Head coach

- Ralph Miller (Kansas)

Assistant coach(es)

Legend

- (C) Team captain
- (S) Suspended
- (I) Ineligible
- (W) Walk-on
- Injured
- Current redshirt

== Schedule/results ==
Date time, TV	Rank^{#}	Opponent^{#}	Result	Record	Site (attendance) city, state
Non-conference regular season
Dec 1, 1964*		South Dakota	W 93–68	1–0	Iowa Field House; Iowa City, Iowa
Dec 4, 1964*		at No. 11 Kentucky	L 77–85	1–1	Memorial Coliseum; Lexington, Kentucky
Dec 5, 1964*		at Evansville	L 83–90	1–2	Roberts Municipal Stadium; Evansville, Indiana
Dec 12, 1964*		Creighton	W 98–83	2–2	Iowa Field House; Iowa City, Iowa
Dec 19, 1964*		Providence	L 70–71	2–3	Iowa Field House; Iowa City, Iowa
Dec 21, 1964*		North Dakota	W 106–65	3–3	Iowa Field House; Iowa City, Iowa
Dec 28, 1964*		at Southern California; Los Angeles Classic	W 71–65	4–3	L.A. Sports Arena; Los Angeles, California
Dec 29, 1964*		vs. Utah; Los Angeles Classic	L 88–92	4–4	L.A. Sports Arena; Los Angeles, California
Dec 30, 1964*		vs. No. 3 Minnesota; Los Angeles Classic	W 76–74	5–4	L.A. Sports Arena; Los Angeles, California
Big Ten Regular Season
Jan 4, 1965		Wisconsin	W 92–62	6–4 (1–0)	Iowa Field House; Iowa City, Iowa
Jan 9, 1965		at Michigan State	W 85–78	7–4 (2–0)	Jenison Field House; East Lansing, Michigan
Jan 11, 1965		No. 5 Indiana	L 76–85	7–5 (2–1)	Iowa Field House; Iowa City, Iowa
Jan 16, 1965		Michigan State	W 111–68	8–5 (3–1)	Iowa Field House; Iowa City, Iowa
Jan 18, 1965		at No. 5 Indiana	W 74–68	9–5 (4–1)	New Field House; Bloomington, Indiana
Jan 29, 1965*		vs. No. 1 UCLA	W 87–82	10–5	Chicago Stadium; Chicago, Illinois
Feb 6, 1965		Northwestern	W 78–72	11–5 (5–1)	Iowa Field House; Iowa City, Iowa
Feb 8, 1965		at No. 1 Michigan	L 66–81	11–6 (5–2)	Yost Field House; Ann Arbor, Michigan
Feb 13, 1965		at Ohio State	W 82–81	12–6 (6–2)	St. John Arena; Columbus, Ohio
Feb 20, 1965		Purdue	W 101–85	13–6 (7–2)	Iowa Field House; Iowa City, Iowa
Feb 23, 1965		at Illinois	L 80–97	13–7 (7–3)	Assembly Hall; Champaign, Illinois
Feb 27, 1965		at Purdue	L 68–76	13–8 (7–4)	Lambert Fieldhouse; West Lafayette, Indiana
Mar 2, 1965		No. 6 Minnesota	L 70–78	13–9 (7–5)	Iowa Field House; Iowa City, Iowa
Mar 6, 1965		Illinois	W 94–84	14–9 (8–5)	Iowa Field House; Iowa City, Iowa
Mar 9, 1965		at No. 7 Minnesota	L 84–85	14–10 (8–6)	Williams Arena; Minneapolis, Minnesota
*Non-conference game. ^{#}Rankings from AP Poll. (#) Tournament seedings in parentheses.
