= Yitzhak Yitzhaky (politician born 1936) =

Israeli politician (1936–1994)

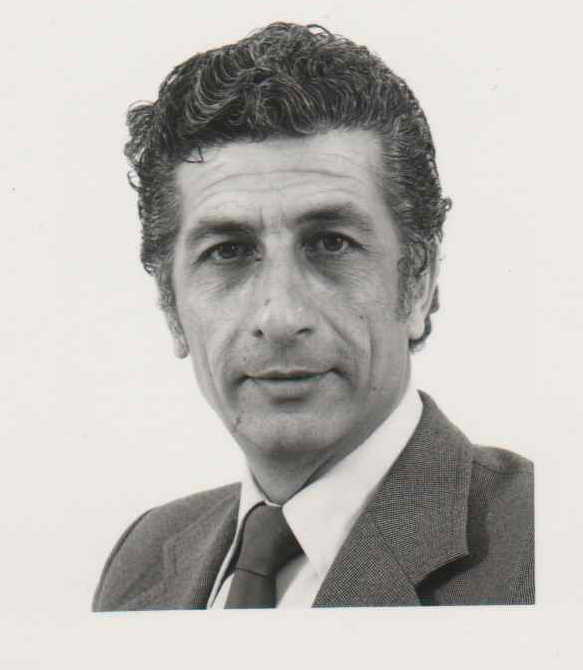

Faction represented in the Knesset
- 1977: Shlomtzion
- 1977–1980: Likud
- 1980–1981: One Israel

Personal details
- Born: 26 November 1936 Tiberias, Mandatory Palestine
- Died: 19 February 1994 (aged 57)

Yitzhak Yitzhaky (Hebrew: יצחק יצחקי, 26 November 1936 – 19 February 1994) was an Israeli educator and politician. He was elected to the ninth Knesset as a member of Ariel Sharon's Shlomtzion.

== Biography ==
Yitzhaky was born in Tiberias and was an active member of the Maccabi youth movement. He studied psychology and education at Bar-Ilan University, gaining an MA. Upon completing his studies, he taught physical education in a number of elementary schools and served as the headmaster of Public School 8 for Children with Special Needs in Tiberias from 1961 to 1963. In 1961, he also founded and directed "Idud", a village for intellectually challenged children.

In 1977, as elections for the ninth Knesset approached, he joined the newly founded Shlomtzion, and gained second place on its Knesset list. The party won two seats, and he was elected to the Knesset along with Ariel Sharon. Immediately after the election, Shlomtzion merged with Likud. On 14 October 1980 Yitzhaky left Likud and formed a one-man faction named One Israel. He lost his seat in the 1981 elections when the party failed to cross the electoral threshold.

== Bibliography ==
- To be like other Children (1975)
- Whisper and Desire (1976)
- Lexicon for Knesset Expressions (1975)
- The Rights of Children in Israeli Legislation (1983)
- Drugs and Minors (1983)
