= 1965 NCAA Men's Basketball All-Americans =

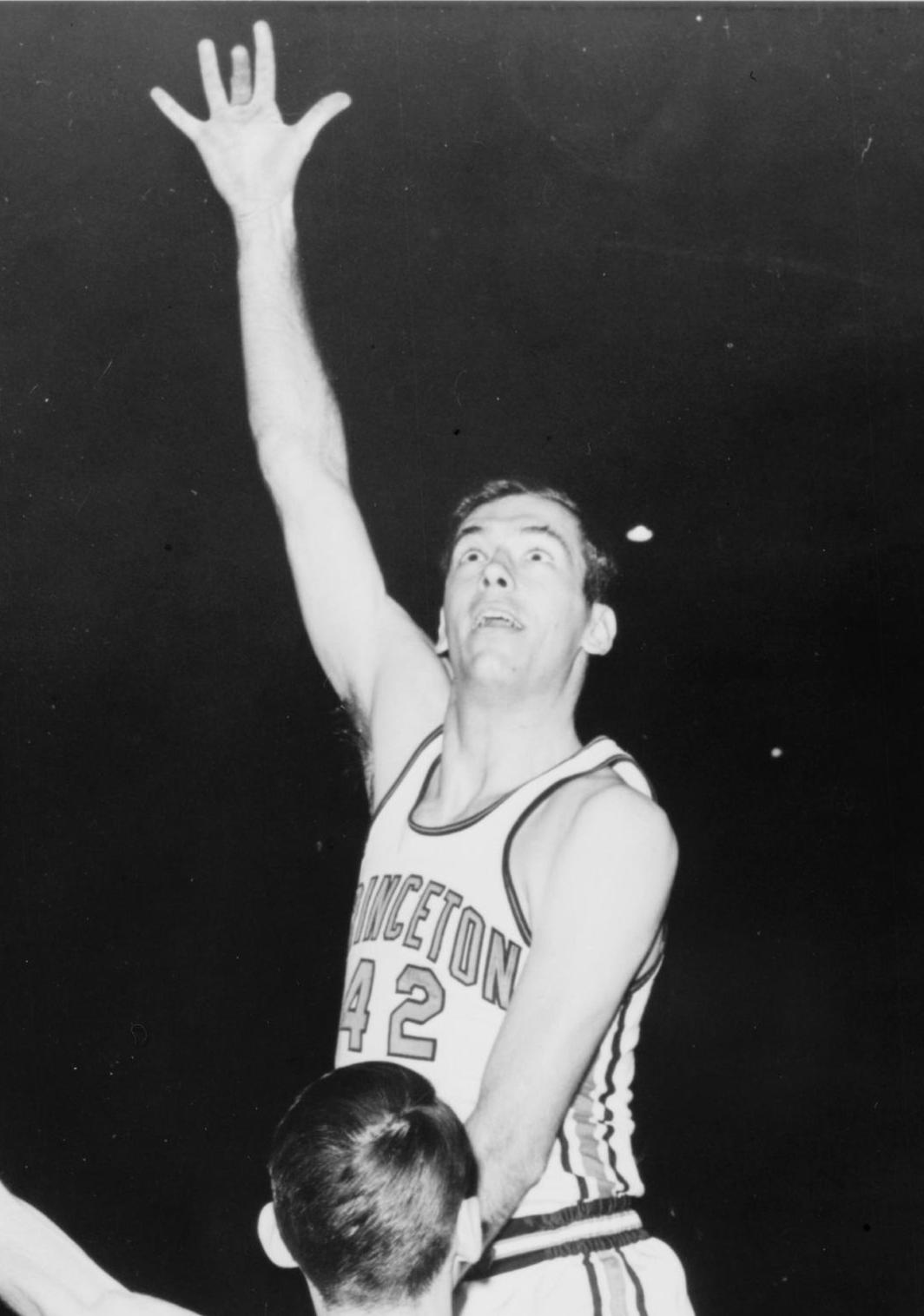
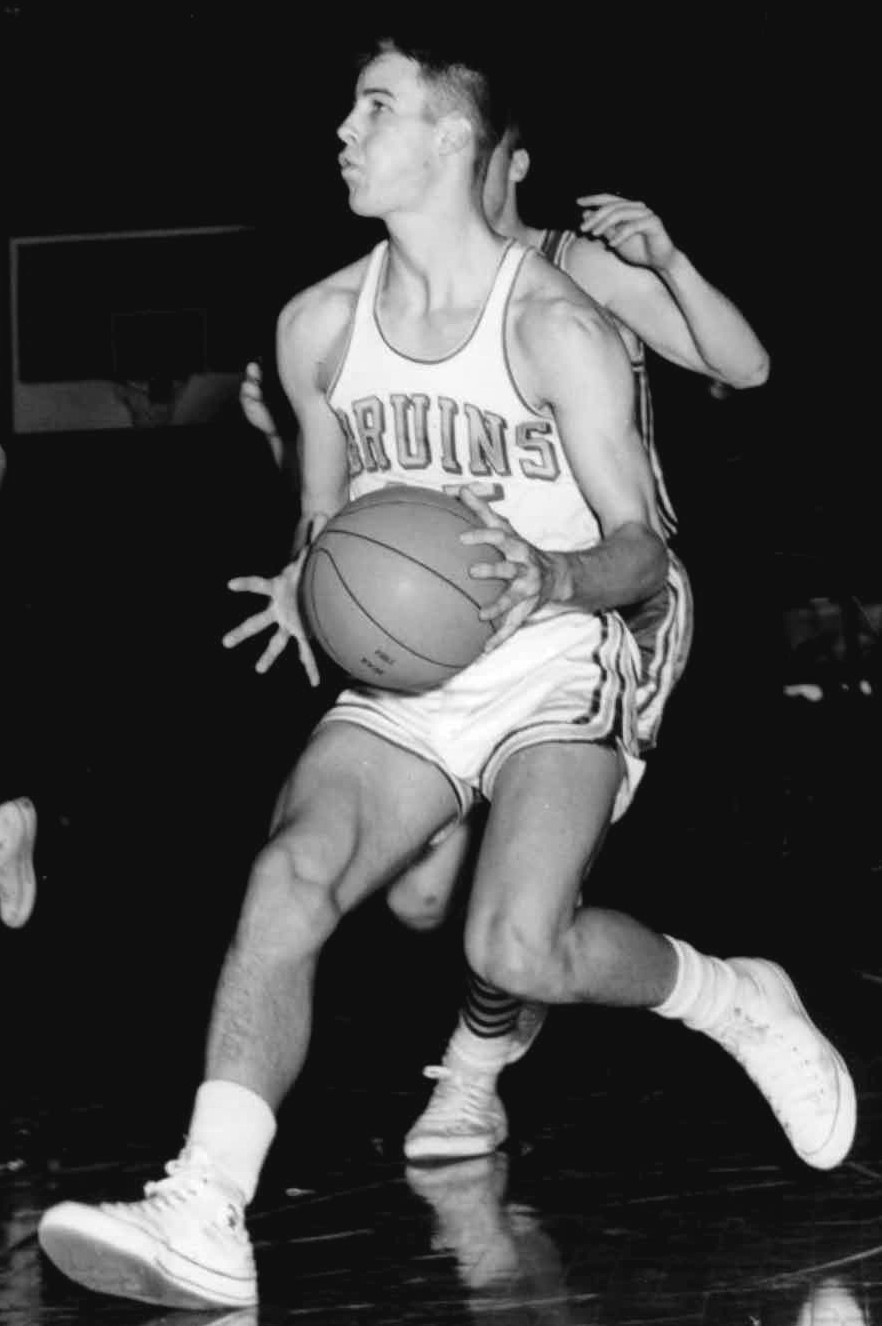
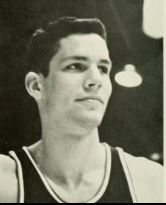
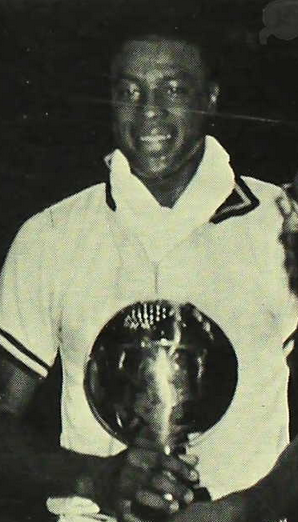
- Members of the 1965 Consensus All-America first team. Clockwise from upper left: Bradley, Goodrich, Russell and Hetzel (not pictured: Barry).
- Awarded for: 1964–65 NCAA University Division men's basketball season

The consensus 1965 College Basketball All-American team, as determined by aggregating the results of four major All-American teams. To earn "consensus" status, a player must win honors from a majority of the following teams: the Associated Press, the USBWA, The United Press International and the National Association of Basketball Coaches.

== 1965 Consensus All-America team ==
Consensus First Team
Player	Position	Class	Team
Rick Barry	F	Senior	Miami (FL)
Bill Bradley	G	Senior	Princeton
Gail Goodrich	G	Senior	UCLA
Fred Hetzel	C	Senior	Davidson
Cazzie Russell	F	Junior	Michigan

Consensus Second Team
Player	Position	Class	Team
Bill Buntin	F	Senior	Michigan
Wayne Estes	F	Senior	Utah State
Clyde Lee	C	Junior	Vanderbilt
Dave Schellhase	G/F	Junior	Purdue
Dave Stallworth	F	Senior	Wichita State

== Individual All-America teams ==
All-America Team
All-America Team	First team		Second team		Third team	
All-America Team	Player	School	Player	School	Player	School
Associated Press	Rick Barry	Miami (FL)	Bill Buntin	Michigan	John Austin	Boston College
Associated Press	Bill Bradley	Princeton	Clyde Lee	Vanderbilt	Billy Cunningham	North Carolina
Associated Press	Wayne Estes	Utah State	Dave Schellhase	Purdue	A. W. Davis	Tennessee
Associated Press	Gail Goodrich	UCLA	Dave Stallworth	Wichita State	Keith Erickson	UCLA
Associated Press	Fred Hetzel	Davidson	Skip Thoren	Illinois	Jimmy Walker	Providence
Associated Press	Cazzie Russell	Michigan				
USBWA	John Austin	Boston College	No second or third teams (10-man first team)			
USBWA	Rick Barry	Miami (FL)	No second or third teams (10-man first team)			
USBWA	Bill Bradley	Princeton	No second or third teams (10-man first team)			
USBWA	A. W. Davis	Tennessee	No second or third teams (10-man first team)			
USBWA	Wayne Estes	Utah State	No second or third teams (10-man first team)			
USBWA	Gail Goodrich	UCLA	No second or third teams (10-man first team)			
USBWA	Fred Hetzel	Davidson	No second or third teams (10-man first team)			
USBWA	Clyde Lee	Vanderbilt	No second or third teams (10-man first team)			
USBWA	Cazzie Russell	Michigan	No second or third teams (10-man first team)			
USBWA	Dave Stallworth	Wichita State	No second or third teams (10-man first team)			
NABC	Rick Barry	Miami (FL)	Bill Buntin	Michigan	John Austin	Boston College
NABC	Bill Bradley	Princeton	Billy Cunningham	North Carolina	Dave Bing	Syracuse
NABC	Gail Goodrich	UCLA	Wayne Estes	Utah State	John Fairchild	Brigham Young
NABC	Fred Hetzel	Davidson	Ollie Johnson	San Francisco	Skip Thoren	Illinois
NABC	Cazzie Russell	Michigan	Dave Stallworth	Wichita State	Jimmy Walker	Providence
UPI	Rick Barry	Miami (FL)	Bill Buntin	Michigan	A. W. Davis	Tennessee
UPI	Bill Bradley	Princeton	Billy Cunningham	North Carolina	Keith Erickson	UCLA
UPI	Wayne Estes	Utah State	Clyde Lee	Vanderbilt	Ollie Johnson	San Francisco
UPI	Gail Goodrich	UCLA	Dave Schellhase	Purdue	Skip Thoren	Illinois
UPI	Fred Hetzel	Davidson	Dave Stallworth	Wichita State	Dick Van Arsdale	Indiana
UPI	Cazzie Russell	Michigan				

AP Honorable Mention:

- Dave Bing, Syracuse
- Dick Ellis, New Mexico
- John Fairchild, Brigham Young
- Hank Finkel, Dayton
- Matt Guokas, St. Joseph's
- Clem Haskins, Western Kentucky
- Lou Hudson, Minnesota
- Jim Jarvis, Oregon State
- Ollie Johnson, San Francisco
- Tom Kerwin, Centenary
- Jim King, Oklahoma State
- Jack Marin, Duke
- Toby Kimball, Connecticut
- Dub Malaise, Texas Tech
- Rick Park, Tulsa
- Chris Pervall, Iowa
- Flynn Robinson, Wyoming
- Willie Somerset, Duquesne
- Steve Thomas, Xavier
- Dick Van Arsdale, Indiana
- Tom Van Arsdale, Indiana
- Jim Washington, Villanova
- Bob Weiss, Penn State
- Walt Wesley, Kansas
- Lonnie Wright, Colorado State

== Academic All-Americans ==
On March 24, 1965, CoSIDA announced the 1965 Academic All-America team. The following is the 1964-65 Academic All-America Men’s Basketball Team as selected by CoSIDA:

First Team
Player	School	Class
Bill Bradley	Princeton	Senior
Billy Cunningham	North Carolina	Senior
Dave Schellhase	Purdue	Junior
Dick Van Arsdale	Indiana	Senior
Tom Van Arsdale	Indiana	Senior

Second Team
Player	School	Class
Tal Brody	Illinois	Senior
Gary Hassman	Oklahoma State	Senior
Jim King	Oklahoma State	Senior
John Ritch	Army	Senior
Warren Rustand	Arizona	Senior

Third Team
Player	School	Class
Ralph D'Altilia	Vermont	Senior
Denis Diarman	Arizona State	Senior
Dave Leach	Wichita State	Senior
Dub Malaise	Texas Tech	Junior
Dick Snyder	Davidson	Junior

== See also ==
- 1964–65 NCAA University Division men's basketball season
