= Cazzie Russell =

American basketball player (born 1944)

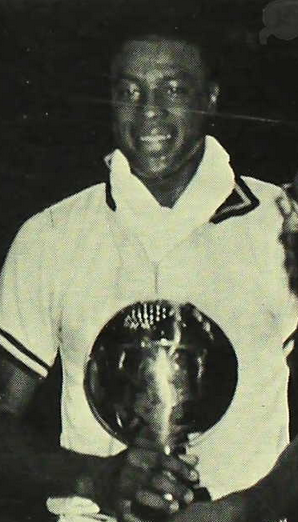
- Russell accepts the 1966 Big Ten MVP trophy

Flagler Saints
- Title: Assistant coach
- League: Peach Belt Conference

Personal information
- Born: June 7, 1944 (age 82) Chicago, Illinois, U.S.
- Listed height: 6 ft 5 in (1.96 m)
- Listed weight: 218 lb (99 kg)

Career information
- High school: Carver (Chicago, Illinois)
- College: Michigan (1963–1966)
- NBA draft: 1966: 1st round, 1st overall pick
- Drafted by: New York Knicks
- Playing career: 1966–1981
- Position: Small forward
- Number: 14, 33, 32
- Coaching career: 1981–present

Career history

Playing
- 1966–1971: New York Knicks
- 1971–1974: Golden State Warriors
- 1974–1977: Los Angeles Lakers
- 1977–1978: Chicago Bulls
- 1978–1979: Great Falls Sky
- 1980–1981: Philadelphia Kings

Coaching
- 1981–1985: Lancaster Lightning
- 1985: New Jersey Jammers
- 1986–1988: Wyoming Wildcatters
- 1988–1990: Atlanta Hawks (assistant)
- 1990–1991: Grand Rapids Hoops
- 1992–1994: Columbus Horizon
- 1996–2009: SCAD
- 2014–2017: Armstrong State (assistant)
- 2019–present: Flagler (women's assistant)

Career highlights
- As player: NBA champion (1970); NBA All-Star (1972); NBA All-Rookie First Team (1967); CBA Newcomer of the Year (1981); National college player of the year (1966); 2× Consensus first-team All-American (1965, 1966); Consensus second-team All-American (1964); No. 33 retired by Michigan Wolverines; Mr. Basketball USA (1962); Fourth-team Parade All-American (1962); As coach: CBA champion (1982); CBA Coach of the Year (1982)

Career NBA statistics
- Points: 12,377 (15.1 ppg)
- Rebounds: 3,068 (3.8 rpg)
- Assists: 1,838 (2.2 apg)
- Stats at NBA.com
- Stats at Basketball Reference
- Collegiate Basketball Hall of Fame

Cazzie Lee Russell (born June 7, 1944) is an American former professional basketball player and coach. An NBA All-Star, he was selected by the New York Knicks with the first overall pick of the 1966 NBA draft. He won an NBA championship with the Knicks in 1970.

== Early life ==
Russell was born on June 7, 1944, in Chicago, Illinois. He was an All-State player two years at Chicago's Carver High School. During the 1961–62 season, he averaged 25 points per game, and was the first player from Illinois to be named Mr. Basketball USA. At the end of the 1961–62 season, his junior year, Russell was also named the Boys' Player of the Year by the Chicago Sun-Times.

That same year, Russell led Carver to the final game of the Illinois High School Association (IHSA) state championship basketball tournament. After winning its first three tournament games, Carver lost by one point in the championship game, 49–48, to Stephen Decatur High School (which had double the student population of Carver), which Decatur won in the final moments. Russell scored 24 points in the game, and was the second leading scorer in the tournament. He was named to the All-Tournament Team.

He is considered one of Chicago's greatest high school basketball players of all time.

== College career ==
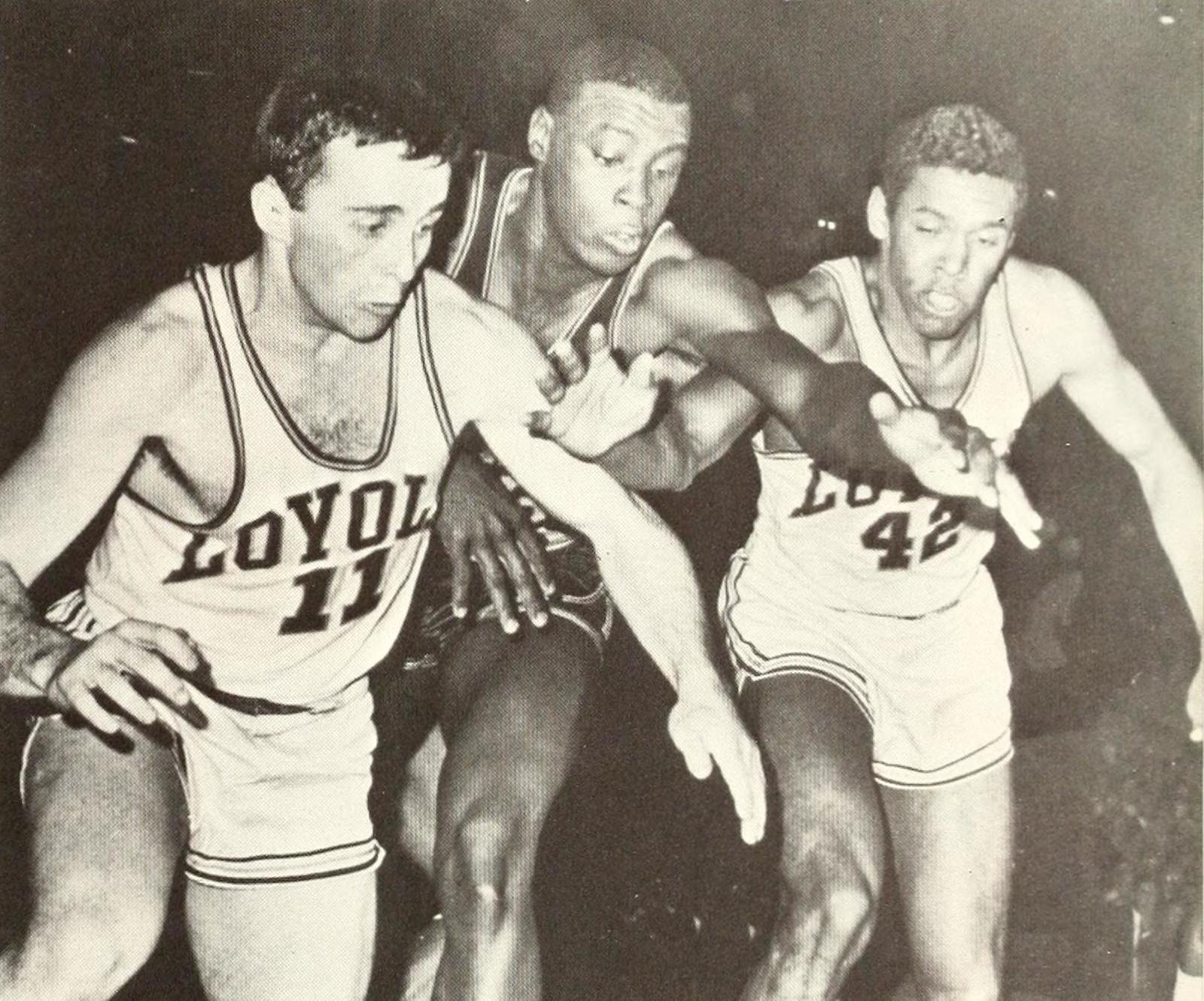
Russell, between John Egan and Ron Miller of the Loyola Ramblers, lunges for the ball

Russell played college basketball at the University of Michigan.

Along with Bill Buntin, Russell led the Wolverines to three consecutive Big Ten Conference titles (1964–66) and to Final Four appearances in 1964 and 1965. In 1965, Michigan defeated Princeton and future Knicks teammate Bill Bradley in the semifinals, 93–76, with Russell scoring 28 points, and Bradley 29. However, Michigan lost in the final game 91–80 to defending national champion UCLA and John Wooden, despite Russell scoring 28 points.

In 1966, Russell averaged 30.8 points per game and was named the College Basketball Player of the Year by the Associated Press (AP). He was similarly selected the top college player by The Sporting News and UPI, as well as winning the U.S. Basketball Writers Association Oscar Robertson Trophy as best college basketball player. The University of Michigan's Crisler Arena, which opened in 1967, has been dubbed The House that Cazzie Built.

In addition to being named Player of the Year in 1966, Russell was selected first-team consensus All-American in 1965 and 1966, and second-team in 1964.

His 30.8 points per game is a Michigan record for scoring in a season (as of 2024). His three-year average of 27.1 points per game is also a Michigan record for a career scoring average (as of 2024).

His number 33 jersey was retired in 1989, and raised to the rafters of Crisler Arena.

Russell was also initiated into Kappa Alpha Psi fraternity - Sigma chapter in 1964. A considerable number of notable basketball players were or are members, such as all-time NBA greats Wilt Chamberlain, Bill Russell, and Oscar Robertson. Russell lived in the fraternity house his junior year.

== Professional career ==
Russell was drafted by the New York Knicks with the first overall pick of the 1966 NBA draft, playing for them for five seasons (1966–1971). While playing for the Knicks he was named to the 1967 All-Rookie Team and won the NBA Finals in 1970.

He is remembered primarily as the sixth man during his five seasons with the Knicks, where he scored 4,584 points in 344 games, though it was in his final two seasons with the Knicks that he was primarily the sixth man. He started only 25 games his rookie season (1966–67), but 45 in his second season (1967–68). The 1968–69 season was his best with the Knicks, starting at small forward in 46 games of the 50 in which he played, averaging 32.9 minutes, 18.3 points and 4.2 rebounds per game. Russell suffered a season-ending fractured right ankle in a late January 1969 game against the Seattle SuperSonics. That same year teammate Bill Bradley started 39 of his 82 games, played less than 30 minutes a game, and averaged 12.4 points per game.

Russell's playing time diminished during his last two years in New York as he sustained on separate occasions a fractured ankle and wrist. He started only 33 games combined over those two years, playing 20 minutes a game or less, and scoring less than 12 points a game. During his five years with the Knicks, Russell's basketball fundamentals improved under the coaching of the Knicks' Red Holzman.

Russell's desire to be traded by the Knicks was granted on May 7, 1971, when he was acquired by the Golden State Warriors for Jerry Lucas. Warriors coach Al Attles considered Russell not only an excellent offensive player, but a strong rebounder and solid defensive player. In his first season with the Warriors (1971–72), he averaged 36.7 minutes per game, 21.4 points per game and 5.4 rebounds per game, higher averages than in any of his five years with the Knicks. He was 17th in MVP voting and appeared in the 1972 NBA All-Star Game.

Russell played two more seasons for the Warriors. He was the first player in NBA history to leave a team after finishing his option year when he signed with the Los Angeles Lakers on September 6, 1974. The Warriors did not offer him a no-cut contract, which Russell had demanded. He played three seasons with the Lakers, starting all 82 games in his final season (1976–77), while averaging 16.4 points a game. The Lakers were 53–29, but were swept in the Western Conference Finals.

While with the Lakers he became the last player to wear the number 32 and 33 jerseys before Magic Johnson and Kareem Abdul-Jabbar, numbers which were later retired in honor of Johnson and Abdul-Jabbar. With the Lakers having signed Jamaal Wilkes during the offseason, Russell was one of the team's last player cuts entering the 1977–78 campaign when he was waived on October 16. In 1978, he signed with the Chicago Bulls, which would conclude his NBA career. Although he averaged only 8.8 points per game in 36 games for the Bulls, on March 17, 1978, he scored 20 points in a game against the Knicks.

In total, Russell spent 12 seasons in the NBA (1966–1978). He was listed as 6 ft 5 in (1.96 m), and 218 pounds (99 kg).

=== Post-NBA career ===
During the 1978–79 season, the team's only season, Russell played for the Great Falls (Montana) Sky of the Western Basketball Association (WBA). He ended his career after the 1980–81 season when he played for the Philadelphia Kings of the Continental Basketball Association (CBA). At 36 years old, he averaged 23 points a game for the Kings, and was voted the CBA's Newcomer of the Year.

== Coaching career ==
In 1981, he became the head coach for the Lancaster Lightning of the CBA. He guided the team to the 1981–82 league championship. During the playoffs, with his team depleted by injuries, Russell came out of retirement and played for the Lightning in the final game of the league championship series, played in Lancaster, Pennsylvania. Russell was named the CBA Coach of the Year in 1982. Russell later coached the Wyoming Wildcatters, Grand Rapids Hoops and Columbus Horizon of the CBA and the Mid-Michigan Great Lakers in the Global Basketball Association. He also served as assistant coach of the Atlanta Hawks for two seasons (1988–1990).

He spent several years as head coach at Centennial High School in Columbus, Ohio, during the mid-1990s before taking the job in Georgia.

Russell was the head coach of the men's basketball team at the Savannah College of Art and Design for 13 seasons, until the college eliminated the sport in 2009.

He served as an assistant coach at Armstrong State University until 2017 when it was discontinued.

For the 2024–2025 season, Russell served as the special assistant to the head coach for the women's basketball team at Flagler College. He had volunteered in the position in the 2019–20 season, and formally joined the coaching staff the following year.

== Military service ==
During the 1960s while with the Knicks, Russell served in the Fighting 69th Regiment of the New York Army National Guard. He started in the army as a private. He participated in army service during the basketball season, including being recalled to active duty during national emergencies.

== Personal life ==
Russell moved to Savannah, Georgia in 1996 with his wife Myrna White-Russell, a former dancer with the Alvin Ailey American Dance Theater, who died in 2014. In 1989, Russell was ordained as a Baptist Minister.

In January 1970, Russell was pulled over by police in Ann Arbor, Michigan and a gun put to his head while police were seeking an escaped prisoner. The only things Russell actually had in common with the prisoner were that he was African-American and had a moustache. Once the policemen realized who he was, he was released. When he returned to practice with the Knicks immediately after the incident, his anger got the best of him and could have caused a rift in the team but for the leadership of team captain Willis Reed, whom Russell later called an amazing man when discussing the incident.

== Honors ==
In 2011, Russell was inducted into the National Collegiate Basketball Hall of Fame. In 1991, he was inducted into the Michigan Sports Hall of Fame. In 1978, he was inducted into the University of Michigan Athletic Hall of Honor. In 1973, he was inducted into the Illinois Basketball Coaches Association Hall of Fame.

In 2006, Russell was voted as one of the 100 Legends of the IHSA Boys Basketball Tournament, a group of former players and coaches in honor of the 100th anniversary of the IHSA boys basketball tournament.

Russell received the Bobby Jones Award in 2015 at the Athletes in Action All Star Breakfast, which is held each year at the NBA All Star Weekend.

In 2016, Russell was the recipient of the Coach Wooden "Keys to Life" Award at the Athletes in Action Legends of the Hardwood Breakfast, which is held each year at the Final Four.

== NBA career statistics ==
Legend
GP	Games played	GS	Games started	MPG	Minutes per game
FG%	Field goal percentage	3P%	3-point field goal percentage	FT%	Free throw percentage
RPG	Rebounds per game	APG	Assists per game	SPG	Steals per game
BPG	Blocks per game	PPG	Points per game	**Bold**	Career high
†	Won an NBA championship

=== Regular season ===
Year	Team	GP	GS	MPG	FG%	3P%	FT%	RPG	APG	SPG	BPG	PPG
1966–67	New York	77	–	22.0	.436	–	.785	3.3	2.4	–	–	11.3
1967–68	New York	**82**	–	28.0	.462	–	.808	4.6	2.4	–	–	16.9
1968–69	New York	50	–	32.9	.450	–	.796	4.2	2.3	–	–	18.3
1969–70†	New York	78	–	20.0	**.498**	–	.775	3.0	1.7	–	–	11.5
1970–71	New York	57	–	18.5	.429	–	.773	3.4	1.4	–	–	9.2
1971–72	Golden State	79	–	**36.7**	.455	–	.833	**5.4**	**3.1**	–	–	**21.4**
1972–73	Golden State	80	–	30.4	.458	–	.864	4.4	2.3	–	–	15.7
1973–74	Golden State	**82**	–	31.4	.482	–	.835	4.3	2.3	.7	**.2**	20.5
1974–75	L.A. Lakers	40	–	26.4	.455	–	**.894**	2.9	2.7	.7	.1	15.7
1975–76	L.A. Lakers	74	–	22.0	.463	–	.892	2.5	1.6	.7	.0	11.8
1976–77	L.A. Lakers	**82**	–	31.5	.490	–	.858	3.6	2.6	**1.0**	.1	16.4
1977–78	Chicago	36	–	21.9	.438	–	.860	2.3	1.7	.5	.1	8.8
Career		817	–	27.2	.464	–	.827	3.8	2.4	.8	.1	15.1
All-Star		1	0	20.0	.308	–	1.000	1.0	.0	–	–	10.0

=== Playoffs ===
Year	Team	GP	GS	MPG	FG%	3P%	FT%	RPG	APG	SPG	BPG	PPG
1967	New York	4	–	22.3	.394	–	.769	**4.8**	**2.8**	–	–	15.5
1968	New York	6	–	**34.8**	**.561**	–	.833	3.8	1.7	–	–	**21.7**
1969	New York	5	–	7.2	.238	–	**1.000**	1.0	.2	–	–	2.4
1970†	New York	**19**	–	16.1	.485	–	.947	2.5	.8	–	–	9.4
1971	New York	11	–	10.9	.391	–	**1.000**	2.0	.7	–	–	5.6
1972	Golden State	5	–	32.2	.492	–	.750	4.4	1.8	–	–	14.2
1973	Golden State	11	–	23.9	.490	–	.864	3.3	1.5	–	–	14.8
1977	L.A. Lakers	11	–	34.7	.414	–	.880	4.4	2.3	**1.5**	**.1**	15.8
Career		72	–	21.8	.460	–	.870	3.1	1.3	1.5	.1	11.8

== See also ==
- University of Michigan Athletic Hall of Honor
