= Bill Buntin =

American basketball player (1942–1968)

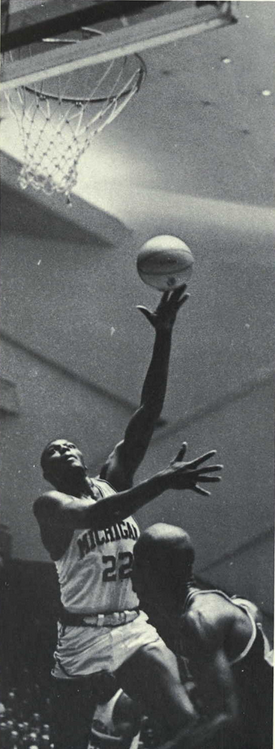
- Buntin from 1965 Michiganensian

Personal information
- Born: May 5, 1942 Detroit, Michigan, U.S.
- Died: May 9, 1968 (aged 26) Detroit, Michigan, U.S.
- Listed height: 6 ft 7 in (2.01 m)
- Listed weight: 250 lb (113 kg)

Career information
- High school: Northern (Detroit, Michigan)
- College: Michigan (1962–1965)
- NBA draft: 1965: territorial pick
- Drafted by: Detroit Pistons
- Playing career: 1965–1966
- Position: Power forward / center
- Number: 17

Career history
- 1965–1966: Detroit Pistons
- 1966–1967: Battle Creek Braves / Twin Cities Sailors

Career highlights
- Consensus second-team All-American (1965); Third-team All-American – AP, NABC, UPI (1964); No. 22 retired by Michigan Wolverines

Career NBA statistics
- Points: 324 (7.7 ppg)
- Rebounds: 252 (6.0 rpg)
- Assists: 36 (0.9 apg)
- Stats at NBA.com
- Stats at Basketball Reference

William L. Buntin (May 5, 1942 – May 9, 1968) was an American professional basketball player in the National Basketball Association (NBA). He played college basketball for the Michigan Wolverines. Buntin died of a heart attack at age 26.

== College career ==
Buntin was born on May 5, 1942, to William and Rosa Buntin. He graduated from, Northern High School in Detroit, Michigan, in 1961, playing under Coach Eddie Powers. He attended Michigan, playing from 1962 to 1965 for Coach Dave Strack.

In three seasons playing center for Michigan, the 6' 7" Buntin had 1,037 rebounds, ranking second in school history. He averaged 15.7 rebounds a game in 1963 and recorded 58 double-doubles in 79 games, still a school record. His 1,725 points ranks 9th in school history. Playing with Cazzie Russell in the 1963–1964 season, Buntin helped Michigan win its first Big Ten title in 16 seasons and advance to the Final Four.

In 1962–1963, Buntin made his varsity debut (freshman didn't play varsity in his era), averaging 22.3 points and 15.7 rebounds for Michigan and Coach Strack. The team finished 16–8.

Michigan improved to 23–5 in 1963–1964, finishing first in the Big Ten Conference. Buntin averaged 23.2 points and 12.5 rebounds, teaming with Cazzie Russell (24.8, 9.0) to lead the Wolverines to the NCAA Tournament for only the second time in program history. In the 1964 NCAA University Division basketball tournament, Buntin scored 26 points with 15 rebounds in the 84–80 win against Loyola (Il) and 15 points and 10 rebounds in the 69–57 victory over Ohio. Buntin had 19 points and 10 bounds in the NCAA Final Four 91–80 loss to Duke. He then had 33 points and 14 rebounds in the 3rd place 100–90 victory over Kansas State.

As a Senior, Michigan finished 24–4 1964–1965, winning the Big Ten title for a second consecutive season. Buntin averaged 20.1 points and 11.5 rebounds alongside Russell (25.7, 7.5). In the 1965 NCAA University Division basketball tournament, Buntin had 26 points and 11 rebounds as Michigan won 98–71 Dayton; he had 26 points and 14 rebounds in the 87–85 over Vanderbilt. In the Final Four 93–76 victory over Bill Bradley and Princeton, Buntin had 22 points and 14 rebounds. In the NCAA Championship Final loss to UCLA, he fouled out with 14 points and 6 rebounds.

In his senior year, the Wolverines advanced to the 1965 NCAA title game, where they lost, 91–80, to John Wooden's UCLA team with Gail Goodrich. He was named an All-American in both 1964 and 1965.

Overall, Buntin averaged 21.8 points and 13.1 rebounds in 79 games at Michigan.

Before Buntin embarked on his NBA career, he played for Team USA in the 1965 Fifth World Games in Budapest, Hungary. He helped the United States to a gold medal.

== Professional career ==
Buntin was selected by the Detroit Pistons as a territorial pick in the 1965 NBA draft.

Buntin played in 42 games as a rookie for the Pistons in the 1965–66 season, averaging 7.7 points and 6.0 rebounds. He was ordered by the Pistons to lose weight and was involved in a conflict with player-coach Dave DeBusschere. Buntin was suspended and then released by the Pistons before the start of the 1966–67 NBA season.

In 1966–1967, Buntin played with the Battle Creek Braves and Twin Cities Sailors of the North American Basketball League under Battle Creek Coach Med Park and Twin Cities Coach Johnny Egan.

In 1967–1968, he played in the preseason with the Indiana Pacers of the American Basketball Association.

In January, 1967, Buntin signed a contract with the Detroit Lions of the National Football League. Weight was cited as an issue in his professional athletic pursuits.

== Death ==
During a pick-up basketball game on May 9, 1968, Buntin suffered a fatal heart attack. He was survived by his parents William and Rosa, sister Beverly and three children.

Former teammate George Pomey said, "(Buntin) was a very easy going, jovial guy who could keep his calm during the toughest games. He accepted everything as it was, never letting things bother him. This was his problem in the pros."

== Career statistics ==
Legend
GP	Games played	GS	Games started	MPG	Minutes per game
FG%	Field goal percentage	3P%	3-point field goal percentage	FT%	Free throw percentage
RPG	Rebounds per game	APG	Assists per game	SPG	Steals per game
BPG	Blocks per game	PPG	Points per game	**Bold**	Career high

=== NBA ===
==== Regular season ====
Year	Team	GP	MPG	FG%	FT%	RPG	APG	PPG
1965–66	Detroit	42	17.0	.395	.615	6.0	.9	7.7

== Honors ==
Buntin has received numerous posthumous honors for his accomplishments in basketball, including:

- He was inducted into the University of Michigan Athletic Hall of Honor in 1980. Only two basketball players, Cazzie Russell and Rudy Tomjanovich were inducted into the Hall of Honor before Buntin.
- In 2006, Buntin's jersey (#22) was honored and hung from the rafters at Crisler Arena. Buntin's jersey became the fifth to be honored in Crisler Arena. Only Cazzie Russell's jersey is retired.
- The award given each year to the best player on the Michigan basketball team is the "Bill Buntin Most Valuable Player Award." Notable past winners include Darius Morris (2011), Trey Burke (2012, 2013), Nik Stauskas (2014), and Zak Irvin (co-winner 2015, 2016).

== See also ==
- University of Michigan Athletic Hall of Honor
