= 1960–61 Georgetown Hoyas men's basketball team =

American college basketball season

1960–61 Georgetown Hoyas men's basketball
- Conference: Independent
- Record: 11–10
- Head coach: Tommy O'Keefe (1st season)
- Captain: Tom Coleman
- Home arena: McDonough Gymnasium

The 1960–61 Georgetown Hoyas men's basketball team represented Georgetown University during the 1960–61 NCAA University Division college basketball season. Tommy O'Keefe coached them in his first season as head coach. The team was an independent and played its home games at McDonough Gymnasium on the Georgetown campus in Washington, D.C. The team finished with a record of 11–10 and had no post-season play, but it was the first Georgetown team to have a winning record since the 1955–56 season.

After Tom Nolan left the head coaching position after the end of the previous season to focus on coaching the Georgetown baseball team, Georgetown hired his assistant, O'Keefe, as his replacement. O'Keefe had been a stand-out on Hoya teams from 1946 to 1950. After that, the National Basketball Association's Washington Capitols selected him in the fourth round of the 1950 NBA draft, and he played for one season in the NBA, splitting it between the Capitols and the Baltimore Bullets. He later served under Nolan as assistant coach at Georgetown from 1956 to 1960. Georgetown's head coaching position paid so little that during his six seasons as head coach, he could coach the Hoyas only part-time, holding a full-time job time outside of coaching in order to make ends meet, and this impaired his ability to spend time on recruiting players. The team would never have a losing record during his tenure as head coach, but also would make no post-season tournament appearances.

The season is notable for Georgetown's final game of the year, a lopsided defeat of an NYU team which after the season concluded was implicated in a major point-shaving scandal.

== Season recap ==
Senior forward and team captain Tom Coleman scored a total of 52 points in the two games the Hoyas played in the Gulf South Classic in Shreveport, Louisiana, in late December 1960 as Georgetown won an in-season tournament for the first time since the 1952-53 season. In the Hoyas' upset win over Fordham in January 1961, he had one of the best games of his collegiate career, scoring 21 points and pulling down 13 rebounds.

Senior guard Brian "Puddy" Sheehan played point guard and for the third straight season led the team in scoring. An excellent ballhandler, he had many assists in the era before assists were tracked regularly by record keepers. He played in all 21 games and scored in double figures in 15 of them, with a season-high 28 points against Boston College and a 16-point, 14-assist game against New York University (NYU) at Madison Square Garden in New York City in the final game of the year.

Junior guard Jim Carrino became a starter this season and complemented Sheehan in the backcourt. A good outside shooter also capable of driving at the basket, he shot 44% from the field and scored 15 or more points nine times. He scored 24 points in the NYU game.

After struggling in his sophomore year the previous season, junior center Bob Sharpenter improved his shooting and inside play. He scored in 20 of the season's 21 games, had four 20-plus-point performances, and averaged 12.1 points and 7.9 rebounds per game. He would emerge fully as one of Georgetown's great players as a senior the following season.

Junior forward Paul "Tag" Tagliabue led the team in rebounds. Like Sheehan, he played in all 21 games and scored in double figures 15 times, with a season-high 21 points against Rhode Island.

Senior forward Tom Matan appeared in 16 games during his final season due to injuries and a coaching transition, highlighting his year with a 21-point performance against American University. Over his three-year varsity career, he was a consistent shooter who contributed significantly in key games, with his sophomore season statistically being his most productive.

Georgetown's season concluded with the 10–10 Hoyas visiting New York City to face NYU at Madison Square Garden before a crowd of 2,573 on March 2, 1961. Coming off a very successful season in 1959–1960 that included a 70–48 drubbing of the Hoyas at McDonough Gymnasium in the schools' most recent meeting and a Final Four run in the 1960 NCAA Tournament, NYU had played inconsistently during the 1960–61 season and entered the game with a record of 11–9, but the Violets had won four straight games and averaged 72 points a game, and New York-area sportswriters viewed them as a heavy favorite to beat the Hoyas. The Hoyas played one of their best games of the season, hitting 44 percent of their field-goal attempts (against a season average of 41 percent) and 64 percent of their free throws (against a season average of 67 percent). Carrino led the team with 24 points, while three Georgetown players (Sheehan with 16 points and 11 assists, Sharpenter with 11 points and 14 rebounds, and Tagliabue with 11 points and 12 rebounds) finished with double-doubles. Only NYU guard Mark Reiner shot well. The Violets' top scorer for the season, forward Al Filardi, a 48 percent field-goal shooter, went 1-for-10 from the field, and center Al Barden, a 31 percent shooter, had a 1-for-8 game. NYU shot 30 percent from the field (against a 40 percent season average) and 46 percent in free throws (against a 68 percent season average). On offense, Sheehan dominated Violets guard Art Loche, who a week earlier had shut down Wake Forest guard Billy Packer, and Sharpenter and Tagliabue grabbed a combined 26 rebounds, while Barden and his fellow center Tom Boose seemed unable to pull down any rebounds at all for NYU. The Hoyas led 39–32 at halftime and 48–32 three-and-a-half minutes into the second half, and later pulled out to a 30-point lead on the way to a 92–69 victory, handing the Violets their second-worst defeat of the season, exceeded only by a 93–69 loss at UCLA. The one-sided game puzzled many observers. Only after the end of the season did an investigation result in the arrest of 37 players from 22 different colleges for point shaving in a major gambling scandal that rocked college basketball in the United States. Among those arrested was NYU guard Ray Popracky — the only Violets player implicated — who had played opposite Tagliabue during the game and had accepted $1,300 for point-shaving in four NYU games during the season, including the Georgetown game, during which he had shot 4-for-12 from the field.

The 1960-61 team finished with a record of 11–10, giving Georgetown its first winning season since 1955–1956. The team had no post-season play and was not ranked in the Top 20 in the Associated Press Poll or Coaches' Poll at any time.

== Roster ==
From the 1958–59 season through the 1967–68 season, Georgetown players wore even-numbered jerseys for home games and odd-numbered ones for away games; for example, a player would wear No. 10 at home and No. 11 on the road. Players are listed below by the even numbers they wore at home.

Junior forward Paul Tagliabue later became Commissioner of the National Football League.

#	Name	Height	Weight (lbs.)	Position	Class	Hometown	Previous Team(s)
4	Bill Johnston	6"7"	N/A	F	Sr.	Everett, WA, U.S.	United States Army
10	Brian "Puddy" Sheehan	5"10"	155	G	Sr.	Silver Spring, MD, U.S.	St. John's College HS (Washington, D.C.)
12	Ray Ohlmuller	6"4"	N/A	G	Sr.	West Englewood, NJ, U.S.	Regis HS (New York, NY)
14	Jay Force	6'0"	N/A	G	Jr.	West Orange, NJ, U.S.	West Orange HS
20	Tom O'Dea	6"3"	N/A	G	Jr.	Westwood, NJ, U.S.	Saint Cecelia School
24	Tom Fitzpatrick	6'3"	N/A	F	Sr.	Washington, D.C., U.S.	St. John's College HS
32	Paul Tagliabue	6'5"	200	F	Jr.	Jersey City, NJ, U.S.	Saint Michael's School
34	Ed Lopata	6'5"	N/A	F	So.	Vandergrift, PA, U.S.	Vandergrift HS
40	Tom Matan	6'3"	N/A	F	Sr.	Chevy Chase, MD, U.S.	Gonzaga College HS (Washington, D.C.)
42	Jim Carrino	6'3"	190	G	Jr.	New York, NY, U.S.	Archbishop Molloy HS
44	Tom Coleman	6'4"	205	C	Sr.	Silver Spring, MD, U.S.	Gonzaga College HS (Washington, D.C.)
50	John Kraljic	6'4"	N/A	F	Jr.	New York, NY, U.S.	Bishop Dubois HS
52	Dan Slattery	6'4"	N/A	F	Jr.	Washington, D.C., U.S.	Gonzaga College HS
54	Bob Sharpenter	6'7"	230	C	Jr.	Aurora, IL, U.S.	Marmion Military Academy

== 1960–61 schedule and results ==
Date time, TV	Rank^{#}	Opponent^{#}	Result	Record	Site city, state
Regular Season
Sat., Dec. 3, 1960 no, no		Loyola Maryland	W 112–71	1-0	McDonough Gymnasium; Washington, D.C.
Tue., Dec. 6, 1960 no, no		Duquesne	L 81–95	1-1	McDonough Gymnasium; Washington, DC
Sat., Dec. 10, 1960 no, no		at American	W 91–78	2-1	Washington Coliseum; Washington, DC
Wed., Dec. 14, 1960 no, no		Maryland	L 67–78	2-2	McDonough Gymnasium; Washington, DC
Sat., Dec. 17, 1960 no, no		at Saint Peter's	L 70–98	2-3	Jersey City Armory; Jersey City, NJ
Wed., Dec. 28, 1960 no, no		vs. Mississippi; Gulf South Classic	W 83–78	3-3	Haynes Gymnasium; Shreveport, LA
Thu., Dec. 29, 1960 no, no		vs. Northwestern State; Gulf South Classic	W 90–65	4-3	Haynes Gymnasium; Shreveport, LA
Fri., Dec. 30, 1960 no, no		vs. Louisiana Tech; Gulf South Classic	L 52–63	4-4	Haynes Gymnasium; Shreveport, LA
Sat., Jan. 7, 1961 no, no		at George Washington	L 75–83	4-5	Fort Myer Gymnasium; Fort Myer, VA
Wed., Jan. 11, 1961 no, no		at Maryland	L 47–55	4-6	Cole Field House; College Park, MD
Sat., Jan. 14, 1961 no, no		at Lafayette	L 65–71	4-7	Kirby Field House; Easton, PA
Wed., Jan. 18, 1961 no, no		at Mount St. Mary's	L 79–93	4-8	Memorial Gymnasium; Emmitsburg, MD
Sat., Jan. 21, 1961 no, no		Fordham	W 73–70	5-8	McDonough Gymnasium; Washington, DC
Sat., Jan. 28, 1961 no, no		Muhlenberg	W 82–73	6-8	McDonough Gymnasium; Washington, DC
Sat., Feb. 4, 1961 no, no		at William & Mary	cancelled		George Preston Blow Gymnasium; Williamsburg, VA
Tue., Feb. 7, 1961 no, no		George Washington	W 93–88	7-8	McDonough Gymnasium; Washington, DC
Fri., Feb. 10, 1961 no, no		Boston College	W 102–78	8-8	McDonough Gymnasium; Washington, DC
Wed., Feb. 15, 1961 no, no		at Navy	L 57–66	8-9	Halsey Field House; Annapolis, MD
Sat., Feb. 18, 1961 no, no		Seton Hall	L 78–88	8-10	McDonough Gymnasium; Washington, DC
Wed., Feb. 22, 1961 no, no		at Rhode Island	W 92–84	9-10	Keaney Gymnasium; Kingston, RI
Sat., Feb. 25, 1961 no, no		Connecticut; Rivalry	W 99–80	10-10	McDonough Gymnasium; Washington, DC
Thu., Mar. 2, 1961 no, no		at New York University	W 92–69	11-10	Madison Square Garden (2,573); New York, NY
*Non-conference game. ^{#}Rankings from AP Poll. (#) Tournament seedings in parentheses.
