= 1964–65 Kansas Jayhawks men's basketball team =

American college basketball season

1964–65 Kansas Jayhawks men's basketball
- Conference: Big Eight Conference
- Record: 17–8 (9–5 Big 8)
- Head coach: Ted Owens (1st season)
- Assistant coach: Jim Dumas (1st season)
- Captain: Dave Schichtle
- Home arena: Allen Fieldhouse

1964–65 Big Eight Conference men's basketball standings
	Conf.				Overall
Team	W		L	PCT	W		L	PCT
Oklahoma State	12	–	2	.857	20	–	7	.741
Kansas	9	–	5	.643	17	–	8	.680
Missouri	8	–	6	.571	13	–	11	.542
Colorado	8	–	6	.571	13	–	12	.520
Iowa State	6	–	8	.429	9	–	16	.360
Kansas State	5	–	9	.357	12	–	13	.480
Nebraska	5	–	9	.357	10	–	15	.400
Oklahoma	3	–	11	.214	8	–	17	.320
Rankings from AP Poll

The 1964–65 Kansas Jayhawks men's basketball team represented the University of Kansas during the 1964–65 college men's basketball season.

== Roster ==
- Walt Wesley
- Al Lopes
- Del Lewis
- Riney Lochmann
- Ron Franz
- Fred Chana
- Dave Schichtle
- Jim Gough
- Kerry Bolton
- Dave Brill
- Larry Norris
- Pat Davis

== Schedule ==
Date time, TV	Rank^{#}	Opponent^{#}	Result	Record	Site city, state
December 1*	No. 18	at Arkansas	W 65–60	1-0	Barnhill Arena; Fayetteville, AR
December 3*	No. 18	New Mexico	W 59–40	2-0	Allen Fieldhouse; Lawrence, KS
December 5*	No. 18	Northwestern	L 55–58	2-1	Allen Fieldhouse; Lawrence, KS
December 11*		vs. Penn State	L 48–50	2-2	Ahearn Field House; Manhattan, KS
December 12*		Loyola (IL)	W 80–60	3-2	Allen Fieldhouse; Lawrence, KS
December 17*		at Cincinnati	L 72–76	3-3	Armory Fieldhouse; Cincinnati, OH
December 19*		at Maryland	W 63–61	4-3	Cole Field House; College Park, MD
December 21*		at No. 7 St. John's	W 71–56	5-3	Alumni Hall; New York, NY
December 26		vs. Iowa State	W 72–55	6-3	Municipal Auditorium; Kansas City, MO
December 29		vs. Kansas State; Sunflower Showdown	W 54–52	7-3	Municipal Auditorium; Kansas City, MO
December 30		vs. Colorado	W 53–51	8-3	Municipal Auditorium; Kansas City, MO
January 4		at Nebraska	W 66–56	9-3 (1-0)	Nebraska Coliseum; Lincoln, NE
January 9		Missouri; Border War	W 82–65	10-3 (2-0)	Allen Fieldhouse; Lawrence, KS
January 11		at Colorado	L 59–61	10-4 (2-1)	Balch Fieldhouse; Boulder, CO
January 16		at Iowa State	W 72–60	11-4 (3-1)	The Armory; Ames, IA
January 20		at Kansas State; Sunflower Showdown	L 63–71	11-5 (3-2)	Ahearn Field House; Manhattan, KS
January 23		Iowa State	L 58–64	11-6 (3-3)	Allen Fieldhouse; Lawrence, KS
February 6		Oklahoma	W 77–68	12-6 (4-3)	Allen Fieldhouse; Lawrence, KS
February 8		at Missouri; Border War	W 71–60	13-6 (5-3)	Brewer Fieldhouse; Columbia, MO
February 13		at Oklahoma	W 74–57	14-6 (6-3)	Field House; Norman, OK
February 15		at Oklahoma State	L 64–68 ^{4OT}	14-7 (6-4)	Gallagher-Iba Arena; Stillwater, OK
February 20		Kansas State; Sunflower showdown	W 86–66	15-7 (7-4)	Allen Fieldhouse; Lawrence, KS
February 23		Nebraska	W 71–62	16-7 (8-4)	Allen Fieldhouse; Lawrence, KS
March 1		Colorado	W 68–62	17-7 (9-4)	Allen Fieldhouse; Lawrence, KS
March 6		Oklahoma State	L 58–64	17-8 (9-5)	Allen Fieldhouse; Lawrence, KS
*Non-conference game. ^{#}Rankings from AP Poll. (#) Tournament seedings in parentheses.
