= 1964–65 Houston Cougars men's basketball team =

American college basketball season

1964–65 Houston Cougars men's basketball
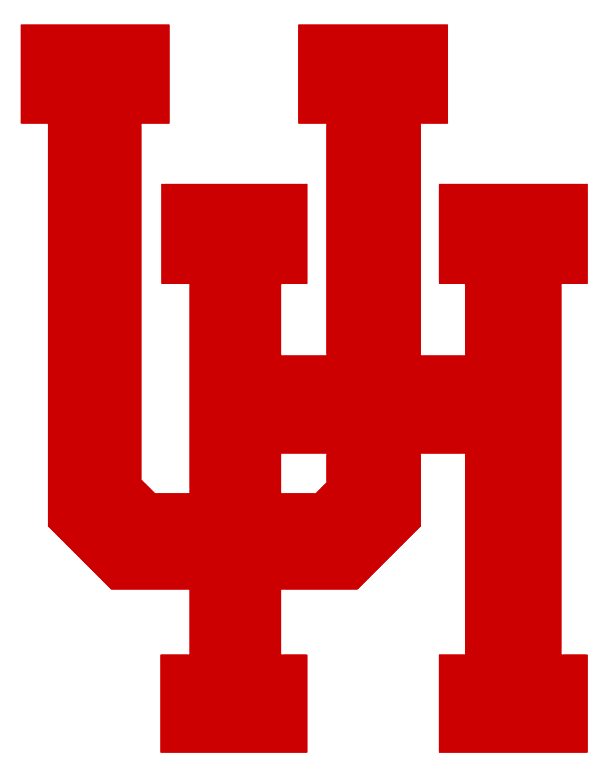

NCAA tournament, Regional Semifinals
- Conference: Independent
- Record: 19–10
- Head coach: Guy Lewis (9th season)
- Assistant coach: Harvey Pate
- Home arena: Jeppesen Fieldhouse; Delmar Fieldhouse; Sam Houston Coliseum

1964–65 NCAA University Division men's basketball independents standings
| | Conf. | | | | Overall |
| Team | W | | L | PCT | W | | L | PCT |
|---|---|---|---|---|---|---|---|---|
| No. 4 Providence | | – | | – | 24 | – | 2 | .923 |
| Miami | | – | | – | 22 | – | 4 | .846 |
| Penn State | | – | | – | 20 | – | 4 | .833 |
| No. 8 Villanova | | – | | – | 23 | – | 5 | .821 |
| Dayton | | – | | – | 22 | – | 7 | .759 |
| Boston College | | – | | – | 21 | – | 7 | .750 |
| Seattle | | – | | – | 19 | – | 7 | .731 |
| Army | | – | | – | 21 | – | 8 | .724 |
| St. John's | | – | | – | 21 | – | 8 | .724 |
| Detroit | | – | | – | 20 | – | 8 | .714 |
| Hardin–Simmons | | – | | – | 17 | – | 8 | .680 |
| Oklahoma City | | – | | – | 21 | – | 10 | .677 |
| Colorado State | | – | | – | 16 | – | 8 | .667 |
| Fairfield | | – | | – | 14 | – | 7 | .667 |
| Houston | | – | | – | 19 | – | 10 | .655 |
| St. Bonaventure | | – | | – | 15 | – | 8 | .652 |
| Texas Western | | – | | – | 16 | – | 9 | .640 |
| West Texas State | | – | | – | 16 | – | 9 | .640 |
| DePaul | | – | | – | 17 | – | 10 | .630 |
| Florida State | | – | | – | 16 | – | 10 | .615 |
| NYU | | – | | – | 16 | – | 10 | .615 |
| Manhattan | | – | | – | 13 | – | 9 | .591 |
| Duquesne | | – | | – | 14 | – | 10 | .583 |
| Creighton | | – | | – | 13 | – | 10 | .565 |
| Georgetown | | – | | – | 13 | – | 10 | .565 |
| Holy Cross | | – | | – | 13 | – | 10 | .565 |
| Syracuse | | – | | – | 13 | – | 10 | .565 |
| Georgia Tech | | – | | – | 14 | – | 11 | .560 |
| Fordham | | – | | – | 15 | – | 12 | .556 |
| Notre Dame | | – | | – | 15 | – | 12 | .556 |
| St. Francis (NY) | | – | | – | 11 | – | 9 | .550 |
| Centenary | | – | | – | 13 | – | 11 | .542 |
| Iona | | – | | – | 12 | – | 11 | .522 |
| Utah State | | – | | – | 13 | – | 12 | .520 |
| Rutgers | | – | | – | 12 | – | 12 | .500 |
| Boston University | | – | | – | 10 | – | 10 | .500 |
| Navy | | – | | – | 10 | – | 10 | .500 |
| Portland | | – | | – | 12 | – | 13 | .480 |
| Seton Hall | | – | | – | 12 | – | 13 | .480 |
| Canisius | | – | | – | 10 | – | 12 | .455 |
| Denver | | – | | – | 11 | – | 14 | .440 |
| Loyola Chicago | | – | | – | 11 | – | 14 | .440 |
| Butler | | – | | – | 11 | – | 15 | .423 |
| Memphis State | | – | | – | 10 | – | 14 | .417 |
| Saint Francis (PA) | | – | | – | 10 | – | 15 | .400 |
| Xavier | | – | | – | 10 | – | 15 | .400 |
| Air Force | | – | | – | 9 | – | 14 | .391 |
| Loyola (LA) | | – | | – | 8 | – | 16 | .333 |
| Marquette | | – | | – | 8 | – | 18 | .308 |
| New Mexico State | | – | | – | 8 | – | 18 | .308 |
| Colgate | | – | | – | 7 | – | 16 | .304 |
| Pittsburgh | | – | | – | 7 | – | 16 | .304 |
| Niagara | | – | | – | 4 | – | 17 | .190 |
Rankings from AP Poll

The 1964–65 Houston Cougars men's basketball team represented the University of Houston in NCAA University Division competition in the 1964–65 season.

Houston, coached by Guy Lewis, played its home games in Jeppesen Fieldhouse, Delmar Fieldhouse, and the Sam Houston Coliseum in Houston, Texas, and was then an Independent.

== Roster ==
1964–65 Houston Cougars men's basketball team
Players
Coaches

| Pos. | # | Name | Height | Weight | Year | Hometown |
|---|---|---|---|---|---|---|
| G | 12 | Gary Grider | 6 ft 1 in (1.85 m) | 175 lb (79 kg) | So | Washington, Indiana |
| G | 20 | David Starks | 5 ft 10 in (1.78 m) | 170 lb (77 kg) | So | Buffalo, Kentucky |
| G | 22 | Joe Hamood | 6 ft 0 in (1.83 m) | 180 lb (82 kg) | Jr | Dearborn, Michigan |
| F | 30 | Leary Lentz | 6 ft 6 in (1.98 m) | 200 lb (91 kg) | So | Clarkton, Missouri |

Head coach

- Guy Lewis (Houston)

Assistant coach(es)

- Harvey Pate (Oklahoma State)

Legend

- (C) Team captain
- (S) Suspended
- (I) Ineligible
- (W) Walk-on
- Injured
- Current redshirt

Roster

== Schedule and results ==
| Date time, TV | Opponent | Result | Record | Site city, state |
Regular season
| Dec 1, 1964 | at Wisconsin | L 65–76 | 0–1 | Wisconsin Field House; Madison, Wisconsin |
| Dec 5, 1964 | Texas A&I | W 94–71 | 1–1 | Jeppesen Fieldhouse; Houston, Texas |
| Dec 7, 1964 | Ohio State | L 69–77 | 1–2 | Sam Houston Coliseum; Houston, Texas |
| Dec 9, 1964 | at North Texas State | L 48–60 | 1–3 | Men's Gymnasium; Denton, Texas |
| Dec 10, 1964 | at TCU | W 67–62 | 2–3 | Daniel-Meyer Coliseum; Fort Worth, Texas |
| Dec 14, 1964 | at Texas A&M | L 67–74 | 2–4 | G. Rollie White Coliseum; College Station, Texas |
| Dec 16, 1964 | vs. Auburn; Bluebonnet Classic | W 50–48 | 3–4 | Rice Gymnasium; Houston, Texas |
| Dec 17, 1964 | vs. Texas A&M; Bluebonnet Classic | W 59–49 | 4–4 | Rice Gymnasium; Houston, Texas |
| Dec 19, 1964 | Colorado | W 70–61 | 5–4 | Delmar Fieldhouse; Houston, Texas |
| Dec 26, 1964 | Rhode Island | W 74–68 | 6–4 | Jeppesen Fieldhouse; Houston, Texas |
| Dec 28, 1964 | vs. Penn State; Motor City Classic | L 57–59 | 6–5 | Calihan Hall; Detroit, Michigan |
| Dec 29, 1964 | vs. Valparaiso; Motor City Classic | W 84–81 | 7–5 | Calihan Hall; Detroit, Michigan |
| Jan 2, 1965 | Trinity (TX) | W 116–79 | 8–5 | Jeppesen Fieldhouse; Houston, Texas |
| Jan 4, 1965 | Oklahoma City | W 61–54 | 9–5 | Jeppesen Fieldhouse; Houston, Texas |
| Jan 9, 1965 | Notre Dame | L 80–110 | 9–6 | Delmar Fieldhouse; Houston, Texas |
| Jan 13, 1965 | Southwestern | W 89–64 | 10–6 | Jeppesen Fieldhouse; Houston, Texas |
| Jan 16, 1965 | North Texas State | W 117–83 | 11–6 | Jeppesen Fieldhouse; Houston, Texas |
| Jan 18, 1965 | TCU | W 108–87 | 12–6 | Delmar Fieldhouse; Houston, Texas |
| Jan 28, 1965 | Baylor | W 80–78 | 13–6 | Delmar Fieldhouse; Houston, Texas |
| Jan 30, 1965 | Texas A&M | W 79–74 | 14–6 | Delmar Fieldhouse; Houston, Texas |
| Feb 6, 1965 | Loyola (LA) | W 104–80 | 15–6 | Jeppesen Fieldhouse; Houston, Texas |
| Feb 9, 1965 | at Trinity (TX) | W 139–87 | 16–6 | Unknown; San Antonio, Texas |
| Feb 13, 1965 | Centenary (LA) | W 95–84 | 17–6 | Jeppesen Fieldhouse; Houston, Texas |
| Feb 16, 1965 | Texas Wesleyan | W 122–105 | 18–6 | Jeppesen Fieldhouse; Houston, Texas |
| Feb 20, 1965 | at Miami (FL) | L 91–103 | 18–7 | Miami Beach Exhibition Hall; Miami Beach, Florida |
| Feb 27, 1965 | at Oklahoma City | L 79–85 | 18–8 | Frederickson Fieldhouse; Oklahoma City, Oklahoma |
NCAA tournament
| Mar 8, 1965 | vs. Notre Dame; Regional quarterfinals – First round | W 99–98 | 19–8 | Lubbock Municipal Coliseum; Lubbock, Texas |
| Mar 12, 1965 | vs. Oklahoma State; Regional semifinals – Sweet Sixteen | L 60–75 | 19–9 | Ahearn Field House; Manhattan, Kansas |
| Mar 13, 1965 | vs. SMU; Regional third-place game | L 87–89 | 19–10 | Ahearn Field House; Manhattan, Kansas |
*Non-conference game. ^{#}Rankings from AP Poll. (#) Tournament seedings in parentheses. All times are in Central Time.
