= 1964–65 St. Francis Terriers men's basketball team =

American college basketball season

1964–65 St. Francis Terriers men's basketball
- Conference: Independent
- Record: 11–9
- Head coach: Daniel Lynch (17th season)
- Home arena: 69th Regiment Armory

1964–65 NCAA University Division men's basketball independents standings
	Conf.				Overall
Team	W		L	PCT	W		L	PCT
No. 4 Providence		–		–	24	–	2	.923
Miami		–		–	22	–	4	.846
Penn State		–		–	20	–	4	.833
No. 8 Villanova		–		–	23	–	5	.821
Dayton		–		–	22	–	7	.759
Boston College		–		–	21	–	7	.750
Seattle		–		–	19	–	7	.731
Army		–		–	21	–	8	.724
St. John's		–		–	21	–	8	.724
Detroit		–		–	20	–	8	.714
Hardin–Simmons		–		–	17	–	8	.680
Oklahoma City		–		–	21	–	10	.677
Colorado State		–		–	16	–	8	.667
Fairfield		–		–	14	–	7	.667
Houston		–		–	19	–	10	.655
St. Bonaventure		–		–	15	–	8	.652
Texas Western		–		–	16	–	9	.640
West Texas State		–		–	16	–	9	.640
DePaul		–		–	17	–	10	.630
Florida State		–		–	16	–	10	.615
NYU		–		–	16	–	10	.615
Manhattan		–		–	13	–	9	.591
Duquesne		–		–	14	–	10	.583
Creighton		–		–	13	–	10	.565
Georgetown		–		–	13	–	10	.565
Holy Cross		–		–	13	–	10	.565
Syracuse		–		–	13	–	10	.565
Georgia Tech		–		–	14	–	11	.560
Fordham		–		–	15	–	12	.556
Notre Dame		–		–	15	–	12	.556
St. Francis (NY)		–		–	11	–	9	.550
Centenary		–		–	13	–	11	.542
Iona		–		–	12	–	11	.522
Utah State		–		–	13	–	12	.520
Rutgers		–		–	12	–	12	.500
Boston University		–		–	10	–	10	.500
Navy		–		–	10	–	10	.500
Portland		–		–	12	–	13	.480
Seton Hall		–		–	12	–	13	.480
Canisius		–		–	10	–	12	.455
Denver		–		–	11	–	14	.440
Loyola Chicago		–		–	11	–	14	.440
Butler		–		–	11	–	15	.423
Memphis State		–		–	10	–	14	.417
Saint Francis (PA)		–		–	10	–	15	.400
Xavier		–		–	10	–	15	.400
Air Force		–		–	9	–	14	.391
Loyola (LA)		–		–	8	–	16	.333
Marquette		–		–	8	–	18	.308
New Mexico State		–		–	8	–	18	.308
Colgate		–		–	7	–	16	.304
Pittsburgh		–		–	7	–	16	.304
Niagara		–		–	4	–	17	.190
Rankings from AP Poll

The 1964–65 St. Francis Terriers men's basketball team represented St. Francis College during the 1964–65 NCAA men's basketball season. The team was coached by Daniel Lynch, who was in his seventeenth year at the helm of the St. Francis Terriers. The team played as an independent and was not affiliated with a conference.

Prior to the beginning of the season the Terriers were highly rated. Yet, a concern from coach Lynch was their lack of a home court to practice on. Since 1960, the Terriers have played their home games at the 69th Regiment Armory and the team often practiced while soldiers were conducting drills.

The Terriers finished the season at 11–9, and had marquee victories over Seton Hall, Fordham, and CCNY.

== Roster ==
1964–65 St. Francis Brooklyn Terriers men's basketball team
Players
Coaches

Pos.	#	Name	Height	Weight	Year	Previous school	Hometown
C		Ted Kotch	6 ft 8 in (2.03 m)	—	Jr
F		Mark Turenshine	6 ft 5 in (1.96 m)	—	Jr	Sheepshead Bay High School
F		George Steinman	6 ft 4 in (1.93 m)	—
G		Jack Crispi	5 ft 10 in (1.78 m)	—	Jr
G		Alan Fisher	6 ft 2 in (1.88 m)	—
F		George Steinman	6 ft 4 in (1.93 m)	—
F		Richard Marquardt	6 ft 7 in (2.01 m)	—
F		Ed Lein	6 ft 5 in (1.96 m)	—
		Paul De Loca	6 ft 2 in (1.88 m)	—
		John Riddell	6 ft 3 in (1.91 m)	—
		Anthony Alvarez	6 ft 3 in (1.91 m)	—
C		Gilbert Radday	6 ft 8 in (2.03 m)	—	So
		McGuire	—	—
		Murray	—	—

Head coach

- Daniel Lynch (St. Francis '38)

Assistant coach(es)

Legend

- (C) Team captain
- (S) Suspended
- (I) Ineligible
- (W) Walk-on
- Injured
- Current redshirt

== Schedule and results ==
Date time, TV	Opponent	Result	Record	Site city, state
Regular Season
December 2, 1964*	at Pace	W 98–66	1–0	High School of Printing Gymnasium (800); New York, NY
December 9, 1964*	King's (PA)	W 86–70	2–0	69th Regiment Armory (300); New York, NY
December 12, 1964*	Providence	L 55–86	2–1	69th Regiment Armory (1,500); New York, NY
December 16, 1964*	Loyola (MD)	W 76–66	3–1	69th Regiment Armory (500); New York, NY
December 19, 1964*	Bridgeport	W 75–67	4–1	69th Regiment Armory (500); New York, NY
January 3, 1964*	Siena	W 72–69 ^{2OT}	5–1	69th Regiment Armory (500); New York, NY
January 6, 1965*	Villanova	L 49–78	5–2	69th Regiment Armory (1,200); New York, NY
January 8, 1965*	Queens	W 74–63	6–2	(250)
January 23, 1965*	at St. John's	L 61–75	6–3	Alumni Gymnasium (5,855); Jamaica, NY
January 27, 1965*	Manhattan	L 67–74	6–4	69th Regiment Armory (500); New York, NY
January __, 1965*	at Adelphi	W 74–73	7–4	(1,300); Garden City, NY
February 3, 1965*	Seton Hall	W 61–59	8–4	69th Regiment Armory (600); New York, NY
February __, 1965*	at Le Moyne	L 46–53	8–5	Syracuse, NY
February 11, 1965*	at Fordham	W 47–40	9–5	Rose Hill Gymnasium (4,000); Bronx, NY
February 13, 1965*	NYU	L 68–88	9–6	69th Regiment Armory (2,000); New York, NY
February 17, 1965*	at Niagara	L 67–81	9–7	Gallagher Center; Niagara Falls, NY
February 22, 1965*	at C.C.N.Y.	W 68–52	10–7	(600); New York, NY
February 24, 1965*	at Iona	L 64–73	10–8	Mount St. Michael High School (980); Bronx, NY
February 27, 1965*	at Siena	W 71–55	11–8	(1,300); Albany, NY
March 5, 1965*	at Saint Peter's	L 70–77	11–9	Jersey City Armory; Jersey City, NJ
*Non-conference game. ^{#}Rankings from AP Poll. (#) Tournament seedings in parentheses. All times are in Eastern Time.
