= 1964–65 Oklahoma State Cowboys basketball team =

American college basketball season

1964–65 Oklahoma State Cowboys basketball

Big Eight champions

NCAA tournament, Elite Eight
- Conference: Big Eight Conference
- Record: 20–7 (12–2 Big Eight)
- Head coach: Hank Iba (31st season)
- Home arena: Gallagher Hall (Capacity: 6,381)

1964–65 Big Eight Conference men's basketball standings
	Conf.				Overall
Team	W		L	PCT	W		L	PCT
Oklahoma State	12	–	2	.857	20	–	7	.741
Kansas	9	–	5	.643	17	–	8	.680
Missouri	8	–	6	.571	13	–	11	.542
Colorado	8	–	6	.571	13	–	12	.520
Iowa State	6	–	8	.429	9	–	16	.360
Kansas State	5	–	9	.357	12	–	13	.480
Nebraska	5	–	9	.357	10	–	15	.400
Oklahoma	3	–	11	.214	8	–	17	.320
Rankings from AP Poll

The 1964–65 Oklahoma State Cowboys basketball team represented Oklahoma State University as a member of the Big Eight Conference during the 1964–65 NCAA University Division men's basketball season. The team was led by legendary head coach Hank Iba, in his 31st year at the school, and played their home games at Gallagher Hall. The Cowboys finished with a record of 20–7 (12–2 Big Eight) to win the Big Eight title by a three-game margin. They received an automatic bid to the NCAA tournament where they lost to Wichita State in the Midwest regional final.

== Roster ==
1964–65 Oklahoma State Cowboys men's basketball team
Players	Coaches
Pos. / # / Name / Height / Weight / Year / Hometown; F / 22 / James King / 6 ft 6 in (1.98 m) / — / Sr / Oklahoma City, Oklahoma	Head coach: Henry Iba; Assistant coach(es) Legend: (C) Team captain; (S) Suspended; (I) Ineligible; (W) Walk-on; Injured; Current redshirt

== Schedule and results ==
Date time, TV	Rank^{#}	Opponent^{#}	Result	Record	Site (attendance) city, state
Regular season
Dec 1, 1964*		at Southern Illinois	L 55–78	0–1	SIU Arena; Carbondale, Illinois
Dec 3, 1964*		Abilene Christian	W 54–42	1–1	Gallagher Hall; Stillwater, Oklahoma
Dec 5, 1964*		Regis	W 78–30	2–1	Gallagher Hall; Stillwater, Oklahoma
Dec 9, 1964*		Arkansas	W 66–52	3–1	Gallagher Hall; Stillwater, Oklahoma
Dec 12, 1964*		at No. 7 UCLA	L 52–68	3–2	L.A. Sports Arena; Los Angeles, California
Dec 14, 1964*		at Texas	W 73–69 ^{OT}	4–2	Gregory Gymnasium; Austin, Texas
Dec 18, 1964*		vs. Florida State; Vanderbilt Tournament	W 60–56	5–2	Memorial Gymnasium; Nashville, Tennessee
Dec 19, 1964*		at Vanderbilt; Vanderbilt Tournament	L 58–60	5–3	Memorial Gymnasium; Nashville, Tennessee
Dec 28, 1964*		vs. Missouri; Vanderbilt Tournament	L 48–53	5–4	Memorial Gymnasium; Nashville, Tennessee
Dec 29, 1964*		vs. Nebraska; Vanderbilt Tournament	W 74–61	6–4	Memorial Gymnasium; Nashville, Tennessee
Dec 30, 1964*		vs. Oklahoma; Vanderbilt Tournament	W 65–46	7–4	Memorial Gymnasium; Nashville, Tennessee
Jan 4, 1965; 7:35 p.m.		at Iowa State	W 54–52 ^{OT}	8–4 (1–0)	Iowa State Armory; Ames, Iowa
Jan 9, 1965		Nebraska	W 93–54	9–4 (2–0)	Gallagher Hall; Stillwater, Oklahoma
Jan 11, 1965; 8:00 p.m.		Iowa State	W 67–48	10–4 (3–0)	Gallagher Hall; Stillwater, Oklahoma
Jan 23, 1965		at Nebraska	W 55–53	11–4 (4–0)	Nebraska Coliseum; Lincoln, Nebraska
Jan 28, 1965		Colorado	W 59–55 ^{3OT}	12–4 (5–0)	Gallagher Hall; Stillwater, Oklahoma
Jan 30, 1965		Missouri	W 63–55	13–4 (6–0)	Gallagher Hall; Stillwater, Oklahoma
Feb 6, 1965		at Missouri	L 42–49	13–5 (6–1)	Brewer Fieldhouse; Columbia, Missouri
Feb 13, 1965		at Kansas State	W 52–49	14–5 (7–1)	Ahearn Field House; Manhattan, Kansas
Feb 15, 1965		Kansas	W 68–64 ^{4OT}	15–5 (8–1)	Gallagher Hall; Stillwater, Oklahoma
Feb 20, 1965		at Colorado	L 54–57	15–6 (8–2)	Balch Fieldhouse; Boulder, Colorado
Feb 23, 1965		Oklahoma	W 64–54	16–6 (9–2)	Gallagher Hall; Stillwater, Oklahoma
Mar 1, 1965		Kansas State	W 69–60	17–6 (10–2)	Gallagher Hall; Stillwater, Oklahoma
Mar 6, 1965		at Kansas	W 64–58	18–6 (11–2)	Allen Fieldhouse; Lawrence, Kansas
Mar 8, 1965		at Oklahoma	W 89–66	19–6 (12–2)	Field House; Norman, Oklahoma
NCAA tournament
Mar 12, 1965*		vs. Houston; Regional semifinal – Sweet Sixteen	W 75–60	20–6	Ahearn Field House; Manhattan, Kansas
Mar 13, 1965*		vs. Wichita State; Regional final – Elite Eight	L 46–54	20–7	Ahearn Field House; Manhattan, Kansas
*Non-conference game. ^{#}Rankings from AP Poll. (#) Tournament seedings in parentheses. W=West. All times are in Central Time.
