= Tommy O'Keefe =

American basketball player

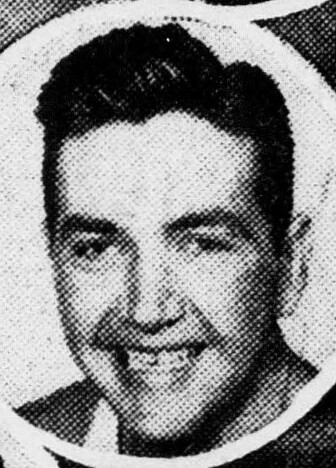
- O'Keefe, circa 1950

Personal information
- Born: June 3, 1928 Jersey City, New Jersey, U.S.
- Died: October 18, 2015 (aged 87) Fredericksburg, Virginia, U.S.
- Listed height: 6 ft 2 in (1.88 m)
- Listed weight: 185 lb (84 kg)

Career information
- High school: St. Peter's Preparatory (Jersey City, New Jersey)
- College: Georgetown (1946–1950)
- NBA draft: 1950: 4th round, 40th overall pick
- Drafted by: Washington Capitols
- Playing career: 1950–1951
- Position: Guard

Career history

Playing
- 1950: Washington Capitols
- 1950–1951: Baltimore Bullets
- 1951–1952: Washington Capitols

Coaching
- 1960–1966: Georgetown

Career NBA statistics
- Points: 23 (3.8 ppg)
- Rebounds: 7 (1.2 rpg)
- Assists: 10 (1.7 apg)
- Stats at NBA.com
- Stats at Basketball Reference

Thomas Vincent O'Keefe (June 3, 1928 – October 18, 2015) was an American professional basketball player. O'Keefe was selected in the fourth round of the 1950 NBA draft by the Washington Capitols after a collegiate career at Georgetown University. O'Keefe only played one season in the league, splitting his time between the Capitols and the Baltimore Bullets.

O'Keefe returned to Georgetown as assistant coach of its basketball team from the 1956–57 season through the 1959–60 season, serving under head coach Tom Nolan. He then succeeded Nolan, and was Georgetown's head coach from the 1960–61 season through the 1965–66 season. A part-time head coach who remained active in business during his tenure, he compiled an overall record of 82–60 in six seasons before quitting the coaching profession in 1966 to focus entirely on business.

== Career statistics ==
Legend
GP	Games played	GS	Games started	MPG	Minutes per game
FG%	Field goal percentage	3P%	3-point field goal percentage	FT%	Free throw percentage
RPG	Rebounds per game	APG	Assists per game	SPG	Steals per game
BPG	Blocks per game	PPG	Points per game	**Bold**	Career high

=== NBA ===
==== Regular season ====
Year	Team	GP	FG%	FT%	RPG	APG	PPG
1950–51	Washington	3	**.385**	.667	**1.3**	.7	**4.0**
1950–51	Baltimore	3	.333	**1.000**	1.0	**2.7**	3.7
Career		6	.357	.750	1.2	1.7	3.8

=== Head coaching record ===
Record table
Season	Team	Overall	Conference	Standing	Postseason
**Georgetown Hoyas** (NCAA University Division independent) (1960–1966)
1960–61	Georgetown	11–10			
1961–62	Georgetown	14–9			
1962–63	Georgetown	13–13			
1963–64	Georgetown	15–10			
1964–65	Georgetown	13–10			
1965–66	Georgetown	16–8			
Georgetown:		82–60			
Total:		82–60			
