= 1961–62 Georgetown Hoyas men's basketball team =

American college basketball season

1961–62 Georgetown Hoyas men's basketball

Richmond Invitational Tournament Champions
- Conference: Independent
- Record: 14–9
- Head coach: Tommy O'Keefe (2nd season)
- Assistant coach: Tom Coleman (1st season)
- Captain: Paul Tagliabue
- Home arena: McDonough Gymnasium

The 1961–62 Georgetown Hoyas men's basketball team represented Georgetown University during the 1961–62 NCAA University Division college basketball season. Tommy O'Keefe coached them in his second season as head coach, but Georgetown's head coaching position paid so little that he could only coach part-time and held a full-time job outside of coaching in order to meet his financial obligations, impairing his ability to recruit players. The team was an independent and played its home games at McDonough Gymnasium on the Georgetown campus in Washington, D.C. The team finished with a record of 14–9 and had no post-season play.

== Season recap ==
Sophomore guard Jim Christy joined the team as point guard this season. Early in the season he scored 25 points against VMI in the Richmond Invitational Tournament and was named the tournament's Most Valuable Player. He scored on a layup with five seconds left in overtime to defeat Seton Hall, and he had big games against George Washington and Rhode Island and in an upset of highly regarded Niagara.

Senior center Bob Sharpenter scored 25 points against Fairfield, had a combined 44 points and 32 rebounds during the two games of the Richmond Invitational, and had 17 points and 13 rebounds against Seton Hall. On February 7, 1962, he had one of the top performances in Georgetown history in the game against St. Joseph's, shooting 16-for-28 from the field to score a Georgetown-record 40 points and grabbing 17 rebounds. Before the season ended, he went on to score 32 points and pull down 11 rebounds in the upset of Niagara, have a 27-point, 22-rebound performance against New York University, and score 30 points and get 18 rebounds against Rhode Island. He led the Hoyas in scoring and rebounding for the season and was named the team's Most Valuable Player.

A good outside shooter, senior guard Jim Carrino shot 48% from the field for the season, the highest average on the team. He scored a career-high 30 points against Maryland, 22 in the upset of Niagara, and 25 in the season finale against Saint Peter's.

Senior forward and team captain Paul "Tag" Tagliabue missed the December 15, 1961, game against Manhattan at Madison Square Garden in New York City to participate as a finalist in the Rhodes Scholarship competition. He averaged 11.3 points per game, with highs of 18 points against George Washington and 13 rebounds against St. Joseph's. He ended his collegiate career as one of Georgetown's great rebounders, second in history in both number of rebounds and average rebounds per game.

The team played a then-record five overtime games during the season, winning four of them. It finished the season with a record of 14–9, the greatest number of wins by a Georgetown men's basketball team since the 1951–52 season, but not enough to earn it an invitation to a post-season tournament. It was not ranked in the Top 20 in the Associated Press Poll or Coaches' Poll at any time.

A school-record eight seniors graduated from the team after the end of this season, including every starter except Jim Christy. The departing players had been responsible for 79.9% of the team's scoring. The next season would be a rebuilding year.

== Roster ==
From the 1958–59 season through the 1967–68 season, Georgetown players wore even-numbered jerseys for home games and odd-numbered ones for away games; for example, a player would wear No. 10 at home and No. 11 on the road. Players are listed below by the even numbers they wore at home.

Senior forward and team captain Paul Tagliabue later became Commissioner of the National Football League.

| # | Name | Height | Weight (lbs.) | Position | Class | Hometown | Previous Team(s) |
|---|---|---|---|---|---|---|---|
| 4 | Vince Wolfington | 6"4" | N/A | F | Sr. | Haverford, PA, U.S. | Malvern Preparatory School |
| 10 | Jim Christy | 6"1" | 185 | G | So. | Brooklyn, NY, U.S. | Saint Pascal HS |
| 14 | Jay Force | 6'0" | N/A | G | Sr. | West Orange, NJ, U.S. | West Orange HS |
| 20 | Joe Mazelin | 6'2" | N/A | G | So. | Indianapolis, IN, U.S. | Sacred Heart HS |
| 22 | Tom O'Dea | 6"3" | N/A | G | Sr. | Westwood, NJ, U.S. | Saint Cecelia School |
| 24 | Charles "Buddy" O'Donnell | 6'3" | N/A | F | So. | Upper Darby Township, Pennsylvania, U.S. | Monsignor Bonner HS |
| 32 | Paul Tagliabue | 6'5" | 200 | F | Sr. | Jersey City, NJ, U.S. | Saint Michael's School |
| 34 | Ed Lopata | 6'5" | N/A | F | Jr. | Vandergrift, PA, U.S. | Vandergrift HS |
| 40 | Chuck Devlin | 6'5" | N/A | F | Sr. | Philadelphia, PA, U.S. | Germantown Academy |
| 42 | Jim Carrino | 6'3" | 190 | G | Sr. | New York, NY, U.S. | Archbishop Molloy HS |
| 50 | John Kraljic | 6'4" | N/A | F | Sr. | New York, NY, U.S. | Bishop Dubois HS |
| 52 | Dan Slattery | 6'4" | N/A | F | Sr. | Washington, DC, U.S. | Gonzaga College HS |
| 54 | Bob Sharpenter | 6'7" | 230 | C | Sr. | Aurora, IL, U.S. | Marmion Military Academy |

== 1961–62 schedule and results ==
| Date time, TV | Rank^{#} | Opponent^{#} | Result | Record | Site city, state |
Regular Season
| Sat., Dec. 2, 1961 no, no | | at Loyola Maryland | W 91–73 | 1-0 | Alumni Gymnasium; Baltimore, MD |
| Wed., Dec. 6, 1961 no, no | | at Maryland | L 70–83 | 1-1 | Cole Field House; College Park, MD |
| Sat., Dec. 9, 1961 no, no | | Fairfield | W 98–82 | 2-1 | McDonough Gymnasium; Washington, DC |
| Mon., Dec. 11, 1961 no, no | | American | W 71–68 ^{2OT} | 3-1 | McDonough Gymnasium; Washington, DC |
| Fri., Dec. 15, 1961 no, no | | at Manhattan | L 73–79 | 3-2 | Madison Square Garden; New York, NY |
| Mon., Dec. 18, 1961 no, no | | at New York Athletic Club | L 97–102 | exhibition | New York Athletic Club Gymnasium; New York, NY |
| Fri., Dec. 29, 1961 no, no | | at Richmond; Richmond Invitational Tournament | W 76–65 | 4-2 | Richmond Arena; Richmond, VA |
| Sat., Dec. 30, 1961 no, no | | vs. VMI; Richmond Invitational Tournament | W 67–59 | 5-2 | Richmond Arena; Richmond, VA |
| Wed., Jan. 3, 1962 no, no | | Mount St. Mary's | W 86–70 | 6-2 | McDonough Gymnasium; Washington, DC |
| Sat., Jan. 6, 1962 no, no | | at George Washington | L 65–82 | 6-3 | Fort Myer Gymnasium; Fort Myer, VA |
| Wed., Jan. 10, 1962 no, no | | Maryland | W 79–78 ^{2OT} | 7-3 | McDonough Gymnasium; Washington, DC |
| Sat., Jan. 13, 1962 no, no | | at Seton Hall | W 84–83 ^{OT} | 8-3 | Walsh Gymnasium; South Orange, NJ |
| Wed., Jan. 17, 1962 no, no | | at Navy | L 56–64 ^{OT} | 8-4 | Halsey Field House; Annapolis, MD |
| Sat., Jan. 20, 1962 no, no | | George Washington | W 87–78 | 9-4 | McDonough Gymnasium; Washington, DC |
| Thu., Feb. 1, 1962 no, no | | at Fairleigh Dickinson | W 84–77 | 10-4 | Campus Gymnasium; Rutherford, NJ |
| Sat., Feb. 3, 1962 no, no | | at Fordham | W 76–72 | 11-4 | Rose Hill Gymnasium; Bronx, NY |
| Wed., Feb. 7, 1962 no, no | | at St. Joseph's | L 70–81 | 11-5 | Palestra; Philadelphia, PA |
| Sat., Feb. 10, 1962 no, no | | at Boston College | L 77–84 | 11-6 | Roberts Center; Chestnut Hill, MA |
| Wed., Feb. 14, 1962 no, no | | Niagara | W 96–91 | 12-6 | McDonough Gymnasium; Washington, DC |
| Sat., Feb. 17, 1962 no, no | | New York University | L 72–70 | 12-7 | McDonough Gymnasium; Washington, DC |
| Wed., Feb. 21, 1962 no, no | | at No. 7 Duquesne | L 52–72 | 12-8 | Civic Arena; Pittsburgh, PA |
| Sat., Feb. 24, 1962 no, no | | Rhode Island | W 93–71 | 13-8 | McDonough Gymnasium; Washington, DC |
| Wed., Feb. 28, 1962 no, no | | La Salle | L 76–78 | 13-9 | McDonough Gymnasium; Washington, DC |
| Sat., Mar. 3, 1962 no, no | | Saint Peter's | W 100–68 | 14-9 | McDonough Gymnasium; Washington, DC |
*Non-conference game. ^{#}Rankings from AP Poll. (#) Tournament seedings in parentheses.
