= 1964–65 Georgetown Hoyas men's basketball team =

American college basketball season

1964–65 Georgetown Hoyas men's basketball
- Conference: Independent
- Record: 13–10
- Head coach: Tommy O'Keefe (5th season)
- Assistant coach: Chuck Devlin (1st season)
- Captain: John Prendergast
- Home arena: McDonough Gymnasium

1964–65 NCAA University Division men's basketball independents standings
	Conf.				Overall
Team	W		L	PCT	W		L	PCT
No. 4 Providence		–		–	24	–	2	.923
Miami		–		–	22	–	4	.846
Penn State		–		–	20	–	4	.833
No. 8 Villanova		–		–	23	–	5	.821
Dayton		–		–	22	–	7	.759
Boston College		–		–	21	–	7	.750
Seattle		–		–	19	–	7	.731
Army		–		–	21	–	8	.724
St. John's		–		–	21	–	8	.724
Detroit		–		–	20	–	8	.714
Hardin–Simmons		–		–	17	–	8	.680
Oklahoma City		–		–	21	–	10	.677
Colorado State		–		–	16	–	8	.667
Fairfield		–		–	14	–	7	.667
Houston		–		–	19	–	10	.655
St. Bonaventure		–		–	15	–	8	.652
Texas Western		–		–	16	–	9	.640
West Texas State		–		–	16	–	9	.640
DePaul		–		–	17	–	10	.630
Florida State		–		–	16	–	10	.615
NYU		–		–	16	–	10	.615
Manhattan		–		–	13	–	9	.591
Duquesne		–		–	14	–	10	.583
Creighton		–		–	13	–	10	.565
Georgetown		–		–	13	–	10	.565
Holy Cross		–		–	13	–	10	.565
Syracuse		–		–	13	–	10	.565
Georgia Tech		–		–	14	–	11	.560
Fordham		–		–	15	–	12	.556
Notre Dame		–		–	15	–	12	.556
St. Francis (NY)		–		–	11	–	9	.550
Centenary		–		–	13	–	11	.542
Iona		–		–	12	–	11	.522
Utah State		–		–	13	–	12	.520
Rutgers		–		–	12	–	12	.500
Boston University		–		–	10	–	10	.500
Navy		–		–	10	–	10	.500
Portland		–		–	12	–	13	.480
Seton Hall		–		–	12	–	13	.480
Canisius		–		–	10	–	12	.455
Denver		–		–	11	–	14	.440
Loyola Chicago		–		–	11	–	14	.440
Butler		–		–	11	–	15	.423
Memphis State		–		–	10	–	14	.417
Saint Francis (PA)		–		–	10	–	15	.400
Xavier		–		–	10	–	15	.400
Air Force		–		–	9	–	14	.391
Loyola (LA)		–		–	8	–	16	.333
Marquette		–		–	8	–	18	.308
New Mexico State		–		–	8	–	18	.308
Colgate		–		–	7	–	16	.304
Pittsburgh		–		–	7	–	16	.304
Niagara		–		–	4	–	17	.190
Rankings from AP Poll

The 1964–65 Georgetown Hoyas men's basketball team represented Georgetown University during the 1964–65 NCAA University Division college basketball season. Tommy O'Keefe coached them in his fifth season as head coach, but Georgetown's head coaching position paid so little that he could only coach part-time and held a full-time job outside of coaching in order to meet his financial obligations, impairing his ability to recruit players. The team was an independent and played its home games at McDonough Gymnasium on the Georgetown campus in Washington, D.C. The team finished the season with a record of 13–10 and had no postseason play.

== Season recap ==
Georgetown' "Classic Era" (1943–1972) teams usually lacked the height and size necessary to compete for national championships, but the 1964–65 team generated excitement because high-scoring junior forward Jim Barry – perhaps the best player of the Classic Era – was returning after missing the previous season while recovering from knee surgery, and because three large and talented sophomores – 6-foot-11 (211-cm) center Frank Hollendoner, 6-foot-10 (208-cm) center-forward Neil Heskin, and 6-foot-8 (203-cm) forward Steve Sullivan – were joining the varsity after a strong season on the freshman team. For the first time, Sports Illustrated picked Georgetown as one of its Top 20 teams as the season began, and hopes were high that the Hoyas would break their drought and earn a berth in a postseason tournament.

An early blow to the team came in November 1964, three weeks before the season's first game. Junior guard Jim Brown and junior forward Owen Gillen had taken part in an off-season Amateur Athletic Union (AAU) Easter basketball tournament in the spring of 1964, and the National Collegiate Athletic Association (NCAA) disallowed the tournament and suspended both players for the first nine games of the 1964-65 season. They thus could not join the team until January 1965. In his first game back with the team, Gillen scored 18 points against Navy, which he followed with a 16-point performance against Delaware four days later. He averaged 13 points and seven rebounds per game for the year and 8.6 rebounds per game for his career, which ended after this season when he did not return for his senior season because of academic issues. Brown, meanwhile, appeared in 14 games and averaged 9.6 points per game.

While Brown and Gillen served their suspensions, junior forward John "Jake" Gibbons scored 42 points in a game at Canisius on December 19, 1964, falling only two points short of the school's single-game scoring record, a 44-point performance by guard Jim Christy the preceding February. Ten days later he scored 21 points against Richmond, and he later had a 15-point game against Navy. He finished the year shooting 53% from the field and 70% from the free-throw line, averaging 11.1 points per game.

Injuries to Heskin, Hollendoner, and Sullivan were another blow to the team. Hollendoner, a highly prized recruit who had received 143 scholarship offers and had chosen Georgetown because of its mathematics program, came off the bench to score 19 points in the season opener against Loyola, then scored 17 against Canisius, had 18 points and 18 rebounds against Delaware, and had another 18 points against George Washington; injuries reduced his playing time as the season wore on, and after a season-high 24 points and 17 rebounds against St. Joseph's he was limited to spot duty. Sullivan badly injured his ankle prior to the season opener and the injury hampered him all season, limiting him to 18 games and an average of 7.6 points per game; highlights for him were 23 points against La Salle and 15 points and 15 rebounds against American.

Barry led the team in scoring for the season, shooting 47% from the field and 86% from the free-throw line and averaging 19.1 points per game. At Fairleigh Dickinson on February 27, 1965, he set the all-time Georgetown scoring record for a single game with 46 points, shooting 17-for-27 (63.0%) from the field and 12-for-14 (85.7%) from the free-throw line to beat Jim Christy's record 44 points set a year and two days earlier. Three days later, Barry shot 13-for-13 from the free-throw line at American and passed the 1,000-point mark for his collegiate career. Over the course of the two games, he set records for scoring, field goals, and free-throw accuracy never equalled at Georgetown.

The team started strong, going 9–3 in its first 12 games despite the suspension of Brown and Gillen. However, the injuries to Heskin, Hollendoner, and Sullivan hurt the Hoyas down the stretch, and they lost seven games in a row and seven of their final 10 games. Georgetown finished with a record of 13–10 and had no post-season play.

The team was not ranked in the Top 20 in the Associated Press Poll or Coaches' Poll at any time.

== Roster ==
From the 1958–59 season through the 1967–68 season, Georgetown players wore even-numbered jerseys for home games and odd-numbered ones for away games; for example, a player would wear No. 10 at home and No. 11 on the road. Players are listed below by the even numbers they wore at home.

#	Name	Height	Weight (lbs.)	Position	Class	Hometown	Previous Team(s)
4	Jim Barry	6"6"	195	F	Jr.	Elizabeth, NJ, U.S.	St. Peter's Preparatory School
10	Pete Mitchell	6"0"	N/A	G	So.	New Orleans, LA, U.S.	Jesuit HS
14	John Prendergast	N/A	N/A	G	Sr.	Utica, NY, U.S.	Notre Dame Junior Senior HS
20	Jim Lyddy	N/A	N/A	G	So.	Bridgeport, CT, U.S.	Fairfield College Preparatory School
22	Jim Brown	5"10"	170	G	Jr.	Ridgewood, NJ, U.S.	Don Bosco Preparatory HS
24	Steve Sullivan	6'8"	200	F	Jr.	East Orange, NJ, U.S.	Essex Catholic HS
32	Frank Hollendoner	6'11"	245	C	Jr.	Chicago, IL, U.S.	St. Patrick HS
34	Ed Solano	6'3"	N/A	F	Jr.	Bellerose, NY, U.S.	St. Mary's HS
40	Dave Philbin	6'4"	N/A	F	Jr.	Clinton, MA, U.S.	Portsmouth Priory School
42	John "Jake" Gibbons	6'5"	200	F/C	Jr.	Cambria Hills, NY, U.S.	Saint Francis HS
44	Owen Gillen	6'5"	210	F/C	Jr.	Totowa, NJ, U.S.	Passaic Valley Regional HS
50	Bob Ward	6'7"	N/A	F	So.	Jersey City, NJ, U.S.	St. Peter's Preparatory School
54	Neil Heskin	6'9"	N/A	F/C	So.	Elizabeth, NJ, U.S.	St. Peter's Preparatory School

== 1964–65 schedule and results ==
Date time, TV	Rank^{#}	Opponent^{#}	Result	Record	Site city, state
Regular Season
Tue., Dec. 1, 1964 no, no		at Loyola Maryland	W 89–75	1-0	Alumni Gymnasium; Baltimore, MD
Sun., Dec. 6, 1964 no, no		Boston College	L 71–89	1-1	McDonough Gymnasium; Washington, DC
Tue., Dec. 8, 1964 no, no		at Rutgers	L 74–80	1-2	College Avenue Gymnasium; New Brunswick, NJ
Fri., Dec. 11, 1964 no, no		at Saint Peter's	W 77–76	2-2	Jersey City Armory; Jersey City, NJ
Sun., Dec. 13, 1964 no, no		Seton Hall	W 78–66	3-2	McDonough Gymnasium; Washington, DC
Sat., Dec. 19, 1964 no, no		at Canisius	L 95–105	3-3	Buffalo Memorial Auditorium; Buffalo, NY
Mon., Dec. 21, 1964 no, no		at Columbia	W 97–85	4-3	University Gymnasium; New York, NY
Tue., Dec. 29, 1964 no, no		Richmond; Georgetown Invitational	W 79–73	5-3	McDonough Gymnasium; Washington, DC
Wed., Dec. 30, 1964 no, no		Lehigh; Georgetown Invitational	W 70–63	6-3	McDonough Gymnasium (900); Washington, DC
Tue., Jan. 5, 1965 no, no		at Navy	W 73–70	7-3	Halsey Field House (500); Annapolis, MD
Sat., Jan. 9, 1965 no, no		Delaware	W 91–64	8-3	McDonough Gymnasium; Washington, DC
Wed., Jan. 13, 1965 no, no		George Washington	W 81–73	9-3	McDonough Gymnasium; Washington, DC
Sat., Jan. 16, 1965 no, no		Fordham	W 69–67	10-3	McDonough Gymnasium; Washington, DC
Wed., Feb. 3, 1965 no, no		No. 3 St. Joseph's	L 72–80	10-4	McDonough Gymnasium; Washington, DC
Sat., Feb. 6, 1965 no, no		Syracuse; Rivalry	L 69–95	10-5	McDonough Gymnasium; Washington, DC
Tue., Feb. 9, 1965 no, no		at George Washington	L 68–73	10-6	Fort Myer Gymnasium; Fort Myer, VA
Sat., Feb. 13, 1965 no, no		Maryland	L 67–85	10-7	McDonough Gymnasium; Washington, DC
Thu., Feb. 18, 1965 no, no		at New York University	L 73–78	10-8	Madison Square Garden; New York, NY
Sat., Feb. 20, 1965 no, no		vs. Fairfield	L 84–88	10-9	Alumni Gymnasium; Baltimore, MD
Wed., Feb. 24, 1965 no, no		at La Salle	L 80–88	10-10	Palestra; Philadelphia, PA
Sat., Feb. 27, 1965 no, no		at Fairleigh Dickinson	W 84–87	11-10	Campus Gymnasium; Rutherford, NJ
Tue., Mar. 2, 1965 no, no		at American	W 112–85	12-10	Fort Myer Gymnasium; Fort Myer, VA
Sat., Mar. 6, 1965 no, no		Manhattan	W 89–75	13-10	McDonough Gymnasium; Washington, DC
*Non-conference game. ^{#}Rankings from AP Poll. (#) Tournament seedings in parentheses.
