= 1964–65 Iowa State Cyclones men's basketball team =

American college basketball season

1964–65 Iowa State Cyclones men's basketball
- Conference: Big Eight Conference
- Record: 9–16 (6–8 Big Eight)
- Head coach: Glen Anderson (6th season)
- Assistant coach: Bob Lamson
- Home arena: Iowa State Armory

1964–65 Big Eight Conference men's basketball standings
	Conf.				Overall
Team	W		L	PCT	W		L	PCT
Oklahoma State	12	–	2	.857	20	–	7	.741
Kansas	9	–	5	.643	17	–	8	.680
Missouri	8	–	6	.571	13	–	11	.542
Colorado	8	–	6	.571	13	–	12	.520
Iowa State	6	–	8	.429	9	–	16	.360
Kansas State	5	–	9	.357	12	–	13	.480
Nebraska	5	–	9	.357	10	–	15	.400
Oklahoma	3	–	11	.214	8	–	17	.320
Rankings from AP Poll

The 1964–65 Iowa State Cyclones men's basketball team represented Iowa State University during the 1964–65 NCAA Division I men's basketball season. The Cyclones were coached by Glen Anderson, who was in his sixth season with the Cyclones. They played their home games at the Iowa State Armory in Ames, Iowa.

They finished the season 9–16, 6–8 in Big Eight play to finish in fifth place.

== Roster ==
1964–65 Iowa State Cyclones men's basketball team
Players
Coaches

Pos.	#	Name	Height	Weight	Year	Hometown
C		Jerry Closter	6 ft 7 in (2.01 m)	—	Jr
C		Mike Cooney	6 ft 6 in (1.98 m)	—
C	54	Dave Fleming	6 ft 5 in (1.96 m)	—	So	Cedar Falls, Iowa
		David Harvey	6 ft 4 in (1.93 m)	—	So	Goldfield, Iowa
F		Gary Jones	6 ft 4 in (1.93 m)	—	Jr
F		Al Koch	6 ft 3 in (1.91 m)	—	Jr
G		Don McKale	6 ft 1 in (1.85 m)	—	Sr
F		Larry Miller	6 ft 4 in (1.93 m)	—
F		Ronald Millik	6 ft 7 in (2.01 m)	—
G		Wilbur Sandbulte	6 ft 2 in (1.88 m)	—	Sr
G		Bob Smoldt	6 ft 3 in (1.91 m)	—
G		Tom Stokesbary	6 ft 2 in (1.88 m)	—
G		Al Tubbs	6 ft 1 in (1.85 m)	—	Jr
G		Bob VanderWilt (C)	6 ft 1 in (1.85 m)	—	Sr
F		Bill Wantiez	—	—	Jr
G		Bob Ziegler	6 ft 3 in (1.91 m)	—	Jr
G		Don Ziegler	6 ft 2 in (1.88 m)	—	So	Laurens, Iowa

Head coach

- Glen Anderson

Assistant coach(es)

Bob Lamson

Legend

- (C) Team captain
- (S) Suspended
- (I) Ineligible
- (W) Walk-on
- Injured
- Current redshirt

== Schedule and results ==
Date time, TV	Rank^{#}	Opponent^{#}	Result	Record	Site city, state
Regular season
December 1, 1964*; 7:30 pm		at State College of Iowa (Northern Iowa); Iowa Big Four	L 50–54	0–1	McElroy Auditorium; Waterloo, Iowa
December 5, 1964*; 7:30 pm		No. 11 Minnesota	L 53–63	0–2	Iowa State Armory; Ames, Iowa
December 9, 1964*; 7:00 pm		at No. 9 Kentucky	L 74–100	0–3	Memorial Coliseum (11,000); Lexington, Kentucky
December 12, 1964*; 8:00 pm		at Air Force	L 63–67	0–4	Cadet Gymnasium; Colorado Springs, Colorado
December 14, 1964*; 9:00 pm		at New Mexico	L 54–87	0–5	Johnson Gymnasium; Albuquerque, New Mexico
December 17, 1964*; 7:35 pm		Drake; Iowa Big Four	W 82–75	1–5	Iowa State Armory; Ames, Iowa
December 22, 1964*; 8:45 pm		Marquette	W 73–64	2–5	Iowa State Armory; Ames, Iowa
December 26, 1964*; 9:30 pm		vs. Kansas; Big Eight Holiday Tournament Quarterfinals	L 55–72	2–6	Municipal Auditorium; Kansas City, Missouri
December 29, 1964*; 2:00 pm		vs. Oklahoma; Big Eight Holiday Tournament Consolation Semifinals	L 72–76	2–7	Municipal Auditorium; Kansas City, Missouri
December 30, 1964*; 2:00 pm		vs. Nebraska; Big Eight Holiday Tournament Seventh Place	W 69–62	3–7	Municipal Auditorium; Kansas City, Missouri
January 4, 1965; 7:35 pm		Oklahoma State	L 52–54 ^{OT}	3–8 (0–1)	Iowa State Armory; Ames, Iowa
January 9, 1965; 8:05 pm		at Oklahoma	W 73–72	4–8 (1–1)	OU Fieldhouse; Norman, Oklahoma
January 11, 1965; 8:00 pm		at Oklahoma State	L 48–67	4–9 (1–2)	Gallagher Hall; Stillwater, Oklahoma
January 16, 1965; 7:35 pm		Kansas	L 60–72	4–10 (1–3)	Iowa State Armory; Ames, Iowa
January 18, 1965; 7:35 pm		at Nebraska	L 77–88	4–11 (1–4)	Nebraska Coliseum; Lincoln, Nebraska
January 23, 1965; 1:30 pm, Big Eight		at Kansas	W 64–58	5–11 (2–4)	Allen Fieldhouse; Lawrence, Kansas
January 25, 1965; 7:35 pm		Oklahoma	W 87–81	6–11 (3–4)	Iowa State Armory; Ames, Iowa
January 30, 1965; 1:30 pm, Big Eight		Kansas State	W 91–76	7–11 (4–4)	Iowa State Armory; Ames, Iowa
February 3, 1965*; 8:00 pm		at Drake; Iowa Big Four	L 52–66	7–12	Veterans Memorial Auditorium; Des Moines, Iowa
February 6, 1965; 7:30 pm		at Kansas State	L 71–82	7–13 (4–5)	Ahearn Fieldhouse; Manhattan, Kansas
February 13, 1965; 7:30 pm		at Missouri	W 89–81 ^{OT}	8–13 (5–5)	Brewer Fieldhouse; Columbia, Missouri
February 15, 1965; 7:30 pm		Colorado	L 71–79	8–14 (5–6)	Iowa State Armory; Ames, Iowa
February 20, 1965; 7:30 pm		Nebraska	L 65–69	8–15 (5–7)	Iowa State Armory; Ames, Iowa
March 6, 1965; 9:05 pm		at Colorado	L 65–90	8–16 (5–8)	Balch Fieldhouse; Boulder, Colorado
March 8, 1965; 7:35 pm		Missouri	W 78–65	9–16 (6–8)	Iowa State Armory; Ames, Iowa
*Non-conference game. ^{#}Rankings from AP poll. (#) Tournament seedings in parentheses. All times are in Central Time.
