= 1964–65 Marquette Warriors men's basketball team =

American college basketball season

1964–65 Marquette Warriors men's basketball
- Conference: Independent
- Record: 8–18
- Head coach: Al McGuire
- Captain: Tom Flynn
- Home arena: Marquette Gymnasium

1964–65 NCAA University Division men's basketball independents standings
| | Conf. | | | | Overall |
| Team | W | | L | PCT | W | | L | PCT |
|---|---|---|---|---|---|---|---|---|
| No. 4 Providence | | – | | – | 24 | – | 2 | .923 |
| Miami | | – | | – | 22 | – | 4 | .846 |
| Penn State | | – | | – | 20 | – | 4 | .833 |
| No. 8 Villanova | | – | | – | 23 | – | 5 | .821 |
| Dayton | | – | | – | 22 | – | 7 | .759 |
| Boston College | | – | | – | 21 | – | 7 | .750 |
| Seattle | | – | | – | 19 | – | 7 | .731 |
| Army | | – | | – | 21 | – | 8 | .724 |
| St. John's | | – | | – | 21 | – | 8 | .724 |
| Detroit | | – | | – | 20 | – | 8 | .714 |
| Hardin–Simmons | | – | | – | 17 | – | 8 | .680 |
| Oklahoma City | | – | | – | 21 | – | 10 | .677 |
| Colorado State | | – | | – | 16 | – | 8 | .667 |
| Fairfield | | – | | – | 14 | – | 7 | .667 |
| Houston | | – | | – | 19 | – | 10 | .655 |
| St. Bonaventure | | – | | – | 15 | – | 8 | .652 |
| Texas Western | | – | | – | 16 | – | 9 | .640 |
| West Texas State | | – | | – | 16 | – | 9 | .640 |
| DePaul | | – | | – | 17 | – | 10 | .630 |
| Florida State | | – | | – | 16 | – | 10 | .615 |
| NYU | | – | | – | 16 | – | 10 | .615 |
| Manhattan | | – | | – | 13 | – | 9 | .591 |
| Duquesne | | – | | – | 14 | – | 10 | .583 |
| Creighton | | – | | – | 13 | – | 10 | .565 |
| Georgetown | | – | | – | 13 | – | 10 | .565 |
| Holy Cross | | – | | – | 13 | – | 10 | .565 |
| Syracuse | | – | | – | 13 | – | 10 | .565 |
| Georgia Tech | | – | | – | 14 | – | 11 | .560 |
| Fordham | | – | | – | 15 | – | 12 | .556 |
| Notre Dame | | – | | – | 15 | – | 12 | .556 |
| St. Francis (NY) | | – | | – | 11 | – | 9 | .550 |
| Centenary | | – | | – | 13 | – | 11 | .542 |
| Iona | | – | | – | 12 | – | 11 | .522 |
| Utah State | | – | | – | 13 | – | 12 | .520 |
| Rutgers | | – | | – | 12 | – | 12 | .500 |
| Boston University | | – | | – | 10 | – | 10 | .500 |
| Navy | | – | | – | 10 | – | 10 | .500 |
| Portland | | – | | – | 12 | – | 13 | .480 |
| Seton Hall | | – | | – | 12 | – | 13 | .480 |
| Canisius | | – | | – | 10 | – | 12 | .455 |
| Denver | | – | | – | 11 | – | 14 | .440 |
| Loyola Chicago | | – | | – | 11 | – | 14 | .440 |
| Butler | | – | | – | 11 | – | 15 | .423 |
| Memphis State | | – | | – | 10 | – | 14 | .417 |
| Saint Francis (PA) | | – | | – | 10 | – | 15 | .400 |
| Xavier | | – | | – | 10 | – | 15 | .400 |
| Air Force | | – | | – | 9 | – | 14 | .391 |
| Loyola (LA) | | – | | – | 8 | – | 16 | .333 |
| Marquette | | – | | – | 8 | – | 18 | .308 |
| New Mexico State | | – | | – | 8 | – | 18 | .308 |
| Colgate | | – | | – | 7 | – | 16 | .304 |
| Pittsburgh | | – | | – | 7 | – | 16 | .304 |
| Niagara | | – | | – | 4 | – | 17 | .190 |
Rankings from AP Poll

The 1964–65 Marquette Warriors men's basketball team represented Marquette University during the 1964–65 men's college basketball season. It was Al McGuire's first season as head coach.

== Roster ==
1964–65 Marquette Warriors men's basketball team
Players
Coaches

| Pos. | # | Name | Height | Weight | Year | Hometown |
|---|---|---|---|---|---|---|
| F | 25 | Tom Flynn | 6 ft 5 in (1.96 m) | 220 lb (100 kg) | Jr | Milwaukee, Wisconsin |
| G | 15 | Bob Wolf | 6 ft 2 in (1.88 m) | 178 lb (81 kg) | Fr | Menomonee Falls, Wisconsin |
| F | 31 | Roger Buxton | 6 ft 3 in (1.91 m) | 195 lb (88 kg) | Jr | Breda, Iowa |

Head coach

- Al McGuire

Assistant coach(es)

Legend

- (C) Team captain
- (S) Suspended
- (I) Ineligible
- (W) Walk-on
- Injured
- Current redshirt

== Schedule ==
| Date time, TV | Rank^{#} | Opponent^{#} | Result | Record | Site city, state |
|---|---|---|---|---|---|
| December 1 | | St. Thomas (MN) | W 69–49 | 1–0 | Marquette Gymnasium; Milwaukee, WI |
| December 5 | | Louisville | L 60–73 | 1–1 | Marquette Gymnasium; Milwaukee, WI |
| December 8 | | at No. 6 Minnesota | L 59–78 | 1–2 | Minneapolis, MN |
| December 12 | | New Mexico State | W 62–54 | 2–2 | Marquette Gymnasium; Milwaukee, WI |
| December 15 | | at Valparaiso | L 61–72 | 2–3 | |
| December 18 | | vs. No. 5 UCLA; Milwaukee Classic | L 52–61 | | Milwaukee Arena; Milwaukee, WI |
| December 19 | | vs. Wisconsin; Milwaukee Classic | W 62–61 | | Milwaukee Arena; Milwaukee, WI |
| December 22; 8:45 pm | | at Iowa State | L 64–73 | | Iowa State Armory; Ames, IA |
| December 26 | | at Loyola (IL) | L 71–83 | | |
| January 2 | | at DePaul | L 54–72 | | |
| January 6 | | Loyola (IL) | W 71–69 ^{OT} | | Marquette Gymnasium; Milwaukee, WI |
| January 9 | | Xavier | W 80–73 | | Marquette Gymnasium; Milwaukee, WI |
| January 13 | | at Wisconsin | W 59–58 | | UW Fieldhouse; Madison, WI |
| January 16 | | at Detroit | L 67–79 | | |
| January 30 | | No. 7 St. John's | W 78–50 | | Marquette Gymnasium; Milwaukee, WI |
| February 4 | | at BYU | L 64–91 | | Provo, UT |
| February 6 | | at Air Force | L 73–75 | | Colorado Springs, CO |
| February 10 | | Memphis State | L 70–82 | | Marquette Gymnasium; Milwaukee, WI |
| February 16 | | at Washington (MO) | L 66–72 | | |
| February 20 | | at Bradley | L 56–77 | | |
| February 22 | | Creighton | L 68–78 | | Marquette Gymnasium; Milwaukee, WI |
| February 25 | | Wisconsin-Milwaukee | W 79–65 | | Marquette Gymnasium; Milwaukee, WI |
| February 27 | | at Xavier | L 55–56 | | |
| March 2 | | Detroit | L 76–90 | | Marquette Gymnasium; Milwaukee, WI |
| March 6 | | No. 9 Villanova | L 69–73 | | Marquette Gymnasium; Milwaukee, WI |
*Non-conference game. ^{#}Rankings from AP Poll. (#) Tournament seedings in parentheses. All times are in Central Time.

== Statistics ==
- Tom Flynn 16.5 ppg
- Paul Carbins 11.7 ppg
