= Paul Tagliabue =

American football administrator (1940–2025)

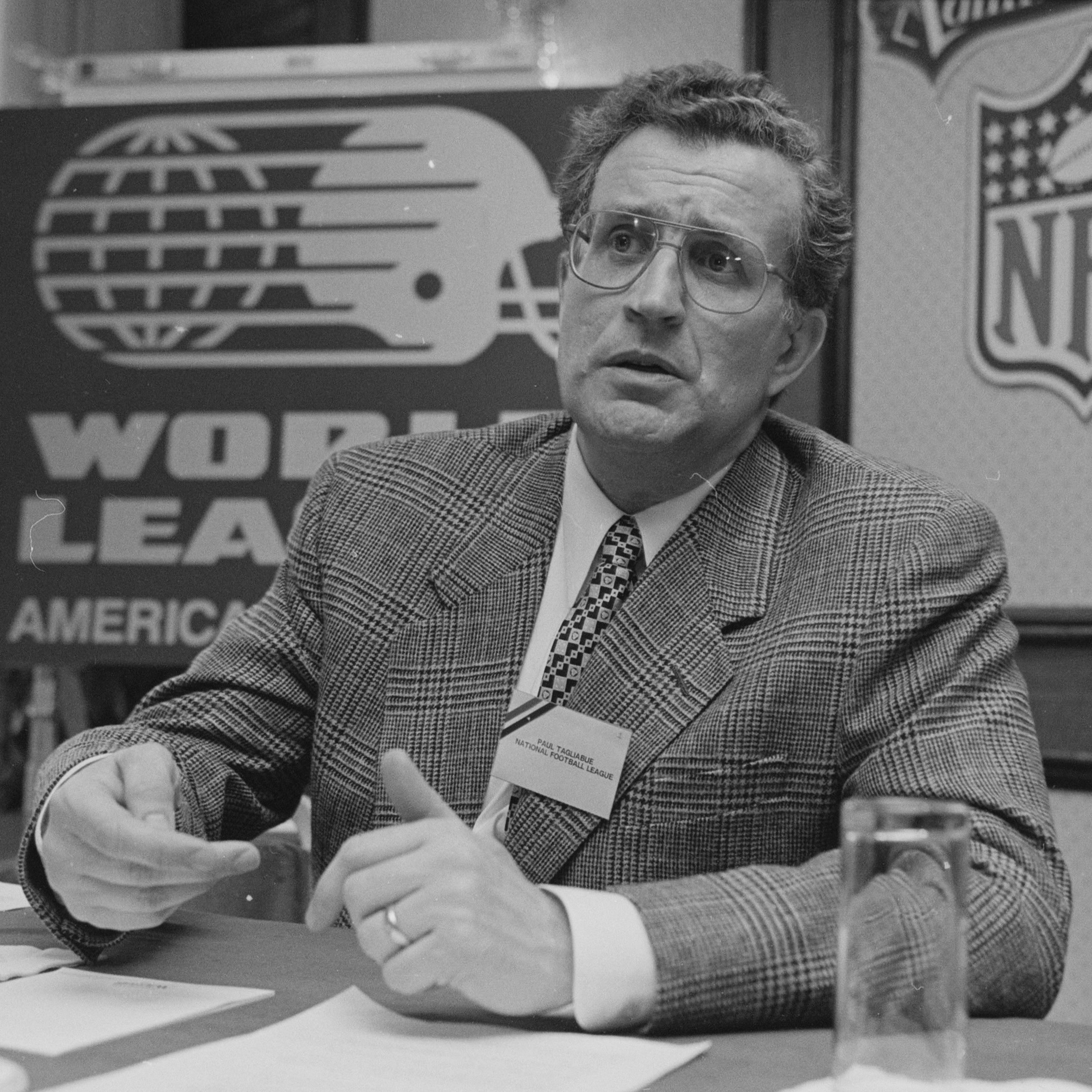
- Tagliabue in 1996

5th Commissioner of the NFL
- In office November 5, 1989 – September 1, 2006
- Preceded by: Pete Rozelle
- Succeeded by: Roger Goodell

Personal details
- Born: Paul John Tagliabue; November 24, 1940 Jersey City, New Jersey, U.S.
- Died: November 9, 2025 (aged 84) Chevy Chase, Maryland, U.S.
- Spouse: Chandler Minter (m. 1965)
- Children: 2
- Education: Georgetown University (BA); New York University (JD)
- Football career
- Pro Football Hall of Fame

Paul John Tagliabue (/ˈtæɡliəbuː/ TAG-lee-ə-boo; November 24, 1940 – November 9, 2025) was an American lawyer who was the commissioner of the National Football League (NFL). He took the position in 1989 and served until September 1, 2006. He had previously served as a lawyer for the NFL.

During his commissionership, the NFL added four new franchises, while keeping the Saints in New Orleans following Hurricane Katrina; four franchises moved cities. Tagliabue postponed games following the September 11, 2001 terrorist attacks, and took a hardline stance against the state of Arizona for failing to recognize a state holiday for Martin Luther King Jr. by moving Super Bowl XXVII to California, and established the World League of American Football in 1989. He was elected to the Pro Football Hall of Fame as part of its Centennial Class of 2020, and formally enshrined on August 7, 2021.

In addition to his NFL career, Tagliabue also served as Chairman of the Board of Directors of Georgetown University from 2009 to 2015.

== Early life and education ==
Tagliabue was born on November 24, 1940, in Jersey City, New Jersey, the third of four sons of Charles and May Tagliabue. He was of Italian descent. Raised in The Heights neighborhood of Jersey City, he attended St. Michael's High School in Union City, New Jersey, where he starred in basketball. Tagliabue received an athletic scholarship to play basketball at Georgetown University and was captain of the 1961–62 team. He graduated in 1962 as president of his senior class, a Rhodes Scholar finalist and a Dean's List graduate. In a congressional hearing in 1992, Tagliabue later revealed he had inadvertently played in a game where an opposing team would fix the outcome of the game in favor of Georgetown, which would be one factor in mind for him taking a staunch stance against gambling later on in his life. Tagliabue graduated from New York University School of Law with honors in 1965.

== Professional career ==
From 1969 to 1989, Tagliabue practiced law with the Washington, D.C., firm Covington & Burling.

== National Football League ==
Tagliabue and his wife (at right) join Miami-Dade Mayor Alex Penelas and his wife (at left) during festivities for Super Bowl XXXIII

After serving as a lawyer for the NFL, Tagliabue was selected by NFL owners to succeed Pete Rozelle as Commissioner of the NFL in 1989.

=== Expansion of the league ===
During his tenure as commissioner, the NFL expanded from 28 teams to 32. New franchises were announced in 1993 to begin play in 1995 in Charlotte and Jacksonville. However, in 1996, then-Cleveland Browns owner Art Modell worked out a deal where he could use that team's current set of players to establish NFL's 31st franchise, the Baltimore Ravens. As a result, the Browns franchise was forced to suspend operations for three seasons before their roster was restocked via an expansion draft in 1999. The 32nd franchise was the Houston Texans, added in 2002.

=== NFL in Europe ===
The NFL continued to play pre-season games in Europe with the American Bowl series. Paul Tagliabue started a spring developmental league, the World League of American Football (WLAF), with seven teams in North America, plus three in Europe. The European teams dominated in 1991, the first season. After the second season, 1992, in which U.S.-based teams played in the World Bowl, the World League was shut down as it was unsuccessful in the United States. In 1995, the spring league returned as the NFL Europe with six teams in Europe. When Tagliabue retired, five teams were based in Germany. Tagliabue's successor Roger Goodell shut down the NFL Europe after the 2007 season. but replaced it with the NFL International Series in October 2007 with regular season games in London. On November 13, 2022, the NFL played its first-ever regular-season game in mainland Europe, in Munich, Germany.

=== Team movements ===
In 1995, Los Angeles lost both its franchises, as the Los Angeles Rams relocated to St. Louis, and the Raiders returned to Oakland. In 1996, the then-players on the Cleveland Browns team were relocated over to Baltimore, officially a new franchise, as indicated above. In 1997, the Houston Oilers relocated to Tennessee, for one year in Memphis and another year using Vanderbilt Stadium as their home field. (The team changed its name from the Oilers to the Titans upon moving to their permanent stadium in Nashville.)

=== Response to September 11 attacks ===
Two days after the terrorist attacks on the World Trade Center and the Pentagon, Tagliabue announced that the games scheduled for the upcoming weekend were cancelled, citing the magnitude of the events and security concerns. It was the first time the league canceled an entire week's slate of games since the 1987 NFL strike.

A week later, it was announced that the postponed games would be added to the end of the regular season, pushing the Super Bowl to February for the first time.

=== Legacy ===
Tagliabue was praised for these politically related actions taken as NFL commissioner:

- He took a stand against the state of Arizona for refusing to establish a state holiday honoring Martin Luther King Jr., as other states had done. In 1993, Super Bowl XXVII was to be held for the first time in Arizona, but after an election, Arizona rejected establishment of a Martin Luther King state holiday. Subsequently, Tagliabue moved the Super Bowl to Pasadena at the Rose Bowl; Arizona would finally host Super Bowl XXX in 1996.
- He forcefully and successfully promoted the return of the Saints to New Orleans after the disruption of their 2005 season in the aftermath of Hurricane Katrina. Tagliabue is credited with having convinced Saints owner Tom Benson to abandon any effort to move the team to San Antonio and with having made the Saints' return to Louisiana a league priority.

However, Tagliabue was criticized for his role in fighting brain injury claims, preventing players from getting necessary treatment and their survivors from getting proper compensation. As a result, Tagliabue was rejected on four occasions by sports writers and broadcasters for the Pro Football Hall of Fame. Fourteen years after his retirement, a special committee voted him in as part of an NFL centennial class. Tim Dahlberg of the Associated Press wrote at the time:

"The NFL of the 1990s was a different animal than it is today, which explains at least somewhat the creation under Paul Tagliabue's watch of something laughably called the Mild Traumatic Brain Injury Committee. What is harder to explain is why Tagliabue put a rheumatologist with no expertise in head injuries in charge of the panel. Or why, in 1994, the then-NFL commissioner claimed the number of concussions in the NFL was relatively small and that the problem of head injuries was 'one of those pack journalism issues'. Tagliabue was on the wrong side of what would become the biggest issue facing the league. He remained there most of his tenure as the NFL fought — at times bitterly — the idea that football was causing former players to suffer, and some to die."

In 2017, Tagliabue apologized: "I do regret those remarks. Looking back, it was not sensible language to use to express my thoughts at the time."

== Post-NFL career ==
Following his tenure as the NFL commissioner Tagliabue returned to Covington & Burling where he served as senior counsel. In 2008, Tagliabue was selected to serve a three-year term as chairman of Georgetown University's board of directors.

In 2012, Tagliabue was appointed by current NFL commissioner Roger Goodell to hear the appeals of the players suspended in the New Orleans Saints bounty scandal. Tagliabue affirmed Goodell's findings of the investigation but overturned all players' suspensions.

On September 4, 2014, Tagliabue was named to the executive board of DC2024, a group trying to bring the 2024 Summer Olympics to Washington, D.C.

Tagliabue was honored for his work with LGBT rights group PFLAG. He served on the advisory board of The Iris Network, a nonprofit blindness rehabilitation agency in Portland, Maine. Tagliabue supported the Vet The Vote campaign to engage veterans and military families as poll workers.

== Personal life ==
On August 28, 1965, Tagliabue married Chandler Minter in Washington, D.C. Minter was originally from Milledgeville, Georgia, and they were introduced at law school. She graduated from the Georgia State College for Women before moving to New York City. As of 2014, he and his wife resided in Chevy Chase, Maryland. They had two children:

- Andrew Paul Tagliabue, known as Drew (born 1969), who is openly gay, resides in New York City.
- Emily Elizabeth Tagliabue (born 1972); who married John D. Rockefeller V, a son of Jay Rockefeller and Sharon Percy Rockefeller. They have two daughters; Laura Chandler Rockefeller (born c. 2000) and Sophia Percy Rockefeller (born c. 2002) and one son John Davison Rockefeller VI (born c. 2007).

Tagliabue was a member of the Leadership Now Project (LNP), which later warned about the "threats posed by a second term of Donald Trump". On July 5, 2024, Tagliabue and 167 other LNP members signed a letter urging Joe Biden to end his 2024 re-election bid.

=== Death ===
On November 9, 2025, Tagliabue died at his home in Chevy Chase, Maryland, of heart failure and complications from Parkinson's disease.

== Awards ==
Tagliabue won the 1992 Eagle Award from the United States Sports Academy. The Eagle Award is the academy's highest international honor and was awarded to Tagliabue for his significant contributions to international sport. He received the Teddy Roosevelt Award from the NCAA in 2007. On January 15, 2020, Tagliabue was elected to the Pro Football Hall of Fame Centennial Class of 2021. He received honorary degrees from St. Peter's College, Colgate University, and Northeastern University.
