= 1964–65 St. John's Redmen basketball team =

American college basketball season

1964–65 St. John's Redmen men's basketball

ECAC Holiday Festival Champions NIT Champions

NIT Championship vs. Villanova, W, 55-51
- Conference: Independent
- Record: 21–8
- Head coach: Joseph Lapchick
- Assistant coach: Lou Carnesecca
- Captains: Jerry Houston; Ken McIntyre
- Home arena: Alumni Hall; Madison Square Garden

1964–65 NCAA University Division men's basketball independents standings
	Conf.				Overall
Team	W		L	PCT	W		L	PCT
No. 4 Providence		–		–	24	–	2	.923
Miami		–		–	22	–	4	.846
Penn State		–		–	20	–	4	.833
No. 8 Villanova		–		–	23	–	5	.821
Dayton		–		–	22	–	7	.759
Boston College		–		–	21	–	7	.750
Seattle		–		–	19	–	7	.731
Army		–		–	21	–	8	.724
St. John's		–		–	21	–	8	.724
Detroit		–		–	20	–	8	.714
Hardin–Simmons		–		–	17	–	8	.680
Oklahoma City		–		–	21	–	10	.677
Colorado State		–		–	16	–	8	.667
Fairfield		–		–	14	–	7	.667
Houston		–		–	19	–	10	.655
St. Bonaventure		–		–	15	–	8	.652
Texas Western		–		–	16	–	9	.640
West Texas State		–		–	16	–	9	.640
DePaul		–		–	17	–	10	.630
Florida State		–		–	16	–	10	.615
NYU		–		–	16	–	10	.615
Manhattan		–		–	13	–	9	.591
Duquesne		–		–	14	–	10	.583
Creighton		–		–	13	–	10	.565
Georgetown		–		–	13	–	10	.565
Holy Cross		–		–	13	–	10	.565
Syracuse		–		–	13	–	10	.565
Georgia Tech		–		–	14	–	11	.560
Fordham		–		–	15	–	12	.556
Notre Dame		–		–	15	–	12	.556
St. Francis (NY)		–		–	11	–	9	.550
Centenary		–		–	13	–	11	.542
Iona		–		–	12	–	11	.522
Utah State		–		–	13	–	12	.520
Rutgers		–		–	12	–	12	.500
Boston University		–		–	10	–	10	.500
Navy		–		–	10	–	10	.500
Portland		–		–	12	–	13	.480
Seton Hall		–		–	12	–	13	.480
Canisius		–		–	10	–	12	.455
Denver		–		–	11	–	14	.440
Loyola Chicago		–		–	11	–	14	.440
Butler		–		–	11	–	15	.423
Memphis State		–		–	10	–	14	.417
Saint Francis (PA)		–		–	10	–	15	.400
Xavier		–		–	10	–	15	.400
Air Force		–		–	9	–	14	.391
Loyola (LA)		–		–	8	–	16	.333
Marquette		–		–	8	–	18	.308
New Mexico State		–		–	8	–	18	.308
Colgate		–		–	7	–	16	.304
Pittsburgh		–		–	7	–	16	.304
Niagara		–		–	4	–	17	.190
Rankings from AP Poll

The 1964–65 St. John's Redmen basketball team represented St. John's University during the 1964–65 NCAA Division I college basketball season. The team was coached by Joseph Lapchick in his twentieth and final year at the school. St. John's was an independent and played their home games at Alumni Hall in Queens, NY and Madison Square Garden in Manhattan.

== Roster ==
#	Name	Height	Position	Class	Hometown	Previous Team(s)
4	Al Swartz	5"10"	G	So.	Uniondale, NY, U.S.	Chaminade HS
5	Jerry Houston	6"1"	G	Sr.	Bronx, NY, U.S.	La Salle Academy
10	Brian Hill	5'11"	G	So.	Ridgewood, NY, U.S.	St. Francis Prep
12	Jack Brunner	6'4"	G/F	So.	Guttenberg, NJ, U.S.	Memorial HS
14	Ken Wirell	6'5"	F	Sr.	Queens, NY, U.S.	Bryant HS
15	William Jones	6'4"	G	So.	Bronx, NY, U.S.	Manhattan Prep
20	Sonny Dove	6"7"	F/C	So.	Brooklyn, NY, U.S.	St. Francis Prep
21	Bob Duerr	6'2"	F	Jr.	Canton, OH, U.S.	N/A
22	Ken McIntyre	6"1"	G	Sr.	Queens, NY, U.S.	Bayside HS
25	Daniel Mascia	6'4"	G/F	Jr.	Brooklyn, NY, U.S.	Thomas Jefferson HS
35	Hank Cluess	6"6"	F	Jr.	Queens, NY, U.S.	Archbishop Molloy HS
44	Bob McIntyre	6"6"	F	Jr.	Queens, NY, U.S.	Holy Cross HS
	Alex Menar	6'5"	F	Jr.	Staten Island, NY, U.S.	La Salle Academy

== Schedule and results ==
Date time, TV	Rank^{#}	Opponent^{#}	Result	Record	Site city, state
Regular Season
12/05/64*	No. 10	Temple	W 60-50	1-0	Alumni Hall; Queens, NY
12/08/64*	No. 10	at Holy Cross	W 77-74	2-0	Worcester Auditorium; Worcester, MA
12/12/64*	No. 10	Miami (FL)	W 79-77	3-0	Alumni Hall; Queens, NY
12/15/64*	No. 7	at St. Joseph's	L 56-71	3-1	The Palestra; Philadelphia, PA
12/19/64*	No. 7	Notre Dame	W 76-72	4-1	Alumni Hall; Queens, NY
12/21/64*	No. 7	Kansas	L 56-71	4-2	Alumni Hall; Queens, NY
12/28/64*		vs. La Salle; ECAC Holiday Festival Quarterfinal	W 78-71	5-2	Madison Square Garden; New York, NY
12/30/64*		vs. Cincinnati; ECAC Holiday Festival Semifinal	W 66-64	6-2	Madison Square Garden; New York, NY
01/02/65*		vs. No. 1 Michigan; ECAC Holiday Festival Championship	W 75-74	7-2	Madison Square Garden; New York, NY
01/05/65*	No. 7	at George Washington	W 72-70 ^{OT}	8-2	Fort Myer Ceremonial Hall; Washington, D.C.
01/09/65*	No. 7	Loyola (LA)	W 74-54	9-2	Alumni Hall; Queens, NY
01/11/65*	No. 7	Creighton	W 72-66	10-2	Alumni Hall; Queens, NY
01/16/65*	No. 7	at Seton Hall	W 76-69	11-2	Walsh Gymnasium; South Orange, NJ
01/23/65*	No. 8	St. Francis (NY)	W 75-61	12-2	Alumni Hall; Queens, NY
01/30/65*	No. 7	at Marquette	L 50-78	12-3	Milwaukee Arena; Milwaukee, WI
02/01/65*	No. 7	at Loyola (IL)	W 92-87	13-3	Alumni Gymnasium; Chicago, IL
02/06/65*		at Army	L 56-58	13-4	USMA Fieldhouse; West Point, NY
02/09/65*		at Villanova	L 43-52	13-5	Villanova Field House; Villanova, PA
02/13/65*		Niagara	W 82-62	14-5	Alumni Hall; Queens, NY
02/15/65*		West Virginia	W 80-61	15-5	Alumni Hall; Queens, NY
02/20/65*		at Fordham	L 46-60	15-6	Rose Hill Gymnasium; Bronx, NY
02/23/65*		vs. Massachusetts	W 76-58	16-6	N/A; N/A
02/26/65*		at Syracuse	L 59-68	16-7	Manley Field House; Syracuse, NY
02/27/65*		at Canisius	L 75-85	16-8	Buffalo Memorial Auditorium; Buffalo, NY
03/04/65*		vs. NYU	W 70-66	17-8	Madison Square Garden; New York, NY
NIT
03/11/65*		vs. Boston College; NIT First Round	W 114-92	18-8	Madison Square Garden; New York, NY
03/15/65*		vs. New Mexico; NIT Quarterfinal	W 61-54	19-8	Madison Square Garden; New York, NY
03/18/65*		vs. Army; NIT Semifinal	W 67-60	20-8	Madison Square Garden; New York, NY
03/20/65*		vs. No. 8 Villanova; NIT Championship	W 55-51	21-8	Madison Square Garden; New York, NY
*Non-conference game. ^{#}Rankings from AP Poll. (#) Tournament seedings in parentheses.

== Team players drafted into the NBA ==
Year	Round	Pick	Player	NBA club
1965	2	23	Ken McIntyre	St. Louis Hawks
1966	2	34	Bob McIntyre	St. Louis Hawks
1967	1	4	Sonny Dove	Detroit Pistons
