= Saint Michael's School (Cranford, New Jersey) =

Catholic school in New Jersey, United States

Coordinates: 40.6579°N 74.3048°W

Saint Michael School
- Cranford, NJ

Information
- Motto: "Fides et Ratio" (Faith and Reason)
- Religious affiliation: Catholic
- Established: 1929
- Principal: Mrs. Sandy Miragliotta
- Grades: Pre-K-8
- Enrollment: 281 (as of 2017)
- Student to teacher ratio: 11:1 (as of 2017)
- Color: Green/Yellow/White
- Athletics conference: Catholic Youth Organization (CYO)
- Mascot: Warrior
- Nickname: Warriors
- Website: smscranford.com

Saint Michael's School, also referred to as SMS or St. Mike's, is an American Catholic parochial school with the motto "Fides et Ratio" (Latin for "Faith and Reason").

St. Michael's, which offers nursery through 8th grade, was founded in 1929 and is located in Cranford, New Jersey, United States.

St. Michael's follows the New Jersey Core Content Curriculum Standards in addition to Curriculum Guidelines set forth by the Archdiocese of Newark. It is also independently accredited by the Middle States Association for Elementary Schools.

St. Michael's students consistently outperform the national and archdiocesan averages on standardized MAP Growth tests.

The school has both a Before-care and Aftercare program

Extracurricular sports are offered by the St. Michael's Sports Association.
