= 1976–77 NCAA Division I men's basketball season =

Basketball season

- Preseason AP No. 1: Michigan Wolverines
- NCAA Tournament: 1977
- Tournament dates: March 12 – 28, 1977
- National Championship: The Omni; Atlanta, Georgia
- NCAA Champions: Marquette Warriors
- Helms National Champions: Marquette Warriors
- Other champions: St. Bonaventure Bonnies (NIT)
- Player of the Year (Naismith, Wooden): Marques Johnson, UCLA Bruins
- Player of the Year (Helms): Marques Johnson, UCLA Bruins

The 1976–77 NCAA Division I men's basketball season began in November 1976, progressed through the regular season and conference tournaments, and concluded with the 1977 NCAA Men's Division I Basketball Tournament Championship Game on March 28, 1977, at The Omni in Atlanta, Georgia. The Marquette Warriors won their first NCAA national championship with a 67–59 victory over the North Carolina Tar Heels.

== Rule changes ==
The slam dunk, prohibited in NCAA basketball games and warm-ups since the 1967–68 season because of criticism that it rewarded height rather than skill, once again became legal after a nine-season absence.

== Season headlines ==
- The National Invitation Tournament expanded from 12 to 16 teams.
- In the Pacific 8 Conference, UCLA won its 11th of what would ultimately be 13 consecutive conference titles.

== Season outlook ==
=== Pre-season polls ===
The top 20 from the AP Poll during the pre-season.

'Associated Press'
Ranking	Team
1	Michigan (21)
2	Marquette (6)
3	North Carolina (9)
4	UCLA (2)
5	Indiana (7)
6	Kentucky (2)
7	UNLV
8	Maryland
9	Louisville (1)
10	Arizona
11	San Francisco (1)
12	Cincinnati
13	Alabama
14	Notre Dame
15	NC State
16	Tennessee
17	Rutgers
18	DePaul
19	UNC Charlotte
20	Missouri

UPI Coaches
Ranking	Team
1	Marquette
2	Michigan
3	North Carolina
4	UCLA
5	Indiana
6	Kentucky
7	UNLV
8	Louisville
9	Arizona
10	Cincinnati
11	Maryland
12	San Francisco
13	Tennessee
14	NC State
15	Missouri
16	Wichita State
17	Georgetown
18	Rutgers
19	Penn
20	Purdue

== Conference membership changes ==
The Eastern Collegiate Basketball League, with eight members, and the Sun Belt Conference, with six members, both began play this season. The ECBL, popularly known as the "Eastern 8," became the Eastern Athletic Association the following season and eventually became the Atlantic 10 Conference.

The Yankee Conference dropped all sports except football at the end of the previous season, and seven of its members left the conference before this season began.

Although Chattanooga joined the Southern Conference this season, it still was considered a Division II program. It completed its transition to Division I status after the conclusion of the season.

School	Former conference	New conference
Boston University Terriers	Yankee Conference	Division I independent
Catholic Cardinals	Mason–Dixon (D–II)	Division I independent
UNC Charlotte 49ers	Division I independent	Sun Belt Conference
Connecticut Huskies	Yankee Conference	Division I independent
Duquesne Dukes	Division I independent	Eastern Collegiate Basketball League
Florida State Seminoles	Division I independent	Metro Conference
George Washington Colonials	Division I independent	Eastern Collegiate Basketball League
Georgia State Panthers	Division I independent	Sun Belt Conference
Jacksonville Dolphins	Division I independent	Sun Belt Conference
James Madison Dukes	Division II independent	Division I independent
Maine Black Bears	Yankee Conference	Division I independent
Massachusetts Minutemen	Yankee Conference	Eastern Collegiate Basketball League
New Hampshire Wildcats	Yankee Conference	Division I independent
New Orleans Privateers	Division I independent	Sun Belt Conference
Northwestern State Demons	NAIA Independent	Division I independent
Old Dominion Monarchs	Division II independent	Division I independent
Penn State Nittany Lions	Division I independent	Eastern Collegiate Basketball League
Pittsburgh Panthers	Division I independent	Eastern Collegiate Basketball League
Portland Pilots	Division I independent	West Coast Athletic Conference
Rhode Island Rams	Yankee Conference	Division I independent
Richmond Spiders	Southern Conference	Division I independent
Robert Morris Colonials	No program	Division I independent
Rutgers Scarlet Knights	Division I independent	Eastern Collegiate Basketball League
Siena Saints	Division II independent	Division I independent
South Alabama Jaguars	Division I independent	Sun Belt Conference
South Florida Bulls	Division I independent	Sun Belt Conference
UC Santa Barbara Gauchos	Division I independent	Pacific Coast Athletic Association
UNC Wilmington Seahawks	NAIA Independent	Division I independent
Valparaiso Crusaders	Indiana Collegiate Conference (D–II)	Division I independent
Vermont Catamounts	Yankee Conference	Division I independent
Villanova Wildcats	Division I independent	Eastern Collegiate Basketball League
Wagner Seahawks	Division II independent	Division I independent
West Virginia Mountaineers	Division I independent	Eastern Collegiate Basketball League
Western Carolina Catamounts	NAIA Independent	Division I independent

== Regular season ==
=== Conferences ===
==== Conference winners and tournaments ====
Conference	Regular season winner	Conference player of the year	Conference tournament	Tournament venue (City)	Tournament winner
Atlantic Coast Conference	North Carolina	Rod Griffin, Wake Forest	1977 ACC men's basketball tournament	Greensboro Coliseum (Greensboro, North Carolina)	North Carolina
Big Eight Conference	Kansas State	Kim Anderson, Missouri, & Mike Evans, Kansas State	1977 Big Eight Conference men's basketball tournament	Kemper Arena (Kansas City, Missouri) (Semifinals and Finals)	Kansas State
Big Sky Conference	Idaho State	None selected	1977 Big Sky Conference men's basketball tournament	ISU Minidome (Pocatello, Idaho)	Idaho State
Big Ten Conference	Michigan	None Selected	No Tournament		
East Coast Conference	Hofstra & Temple (East); Lafayette (West)	Rich Laurel, Hofstra	1977 East Coast Conference men's basketball tournament	Kirby Sports Center (Easton, Pennsylvania)	Hofstra
Eastern Collegiate Basketball League (Eastern 8)	Rutgers (East); Penn State & West Virginia (West)	Norm Nixon, Duquesne	1977 Eastern 8 men's basketball tournament	The Spectrum (Philadelphia, Pennsylvania)	Duquesne
Eastern College Athletic; Conference (ECAC)	Division I ECAC members played as independents during the regular season (see note)	Tony Hanson, Connecticut	1977 ECAC Metro Region tournament	Madison Square Garden (New York, New York)	St. John's
Eastern College Athletic; Conference (ECAC)	Division I ECAC members played as independents during the regular season (see note)	Tony Hanson, Connecticut	1977 ECAC New England Region tournament	Hartford Civic Center (Hartford, Connecticut)	Holy Cross
Eastern College Athletic; Conference (ECAC)	Division I ECAC members played as independents during the regular season (see note)	Tony Hanson, Connecticut	1977 ECAC Southern Region tournament	Campus sites	Syracuse
Ivy League	Princeton	Frank Sowinski, Princeton	No Tournament		
Metro Conference	Louisville	Gary Yoder, Cincinnati	1977 Metro Conference men's basketball tournament	Mid-South Coliseum (Memphis, Tennessee)	Cincinnati
Mid-American Conference	Central Michigan	Matt Hicks, Northern Illinois	No Tournament		
Missouri Valley Conference	New Mexico State & Southern Illinois	Roger Phegley, Bradley	1977 Missouri Valley Conference men's basketball tournament	Levitt Arena (Wichita, Kansas)	Southern Illinois
Ohio Valley Conference	Austin Peay	Otis Howard, Austin Peay	1977 Ohio Valley Conference men's basketball tournament	Dunn Center (Clarksville, Tennessee) (Semifinals and Finals)	Middle Tennessee
Pacific-8 Conference	UCLA	Marques Johnson, UCLA	No Tournament		
Pacific Coast Athletic Association	Long Beach State & San Diego State	Lloyd McMillian, Long Beach State	1977 Pacific Coast Athletic Association men's basketball tournament	Anaheim Convention Center (Anaheim, California)	Long Beach State
Southeastern Conference	Kentucky & Tennessee	Ernie Grunfeld, Tennessee, & Bernard King, Tennessee	No Tournament		
Southern Conference	Furman & VMI	Ron Carter, VMI	1977 Southern Conference men's basketball tournament	Roanoke Civic Center (Roanoke, Virginia) (Semifinals and Finals)	VMI
Southland Conference	Southwest Louisiana	Dan Henderson, Arkansas State	No Tournament		
Southwest Conference	Arkansas	Otis Birdsong, Houston	1977 Southwest Conference men's basketball tournament	The Summit (Houston, Texas)	Arkansas
Sun Belt Conference	UNC Charlotte	Cedric Maxwell, UNC Charlotte	1977 Sun Belt Conference men's basketball tournament	Charlotte Coliseum (Charlotte, North Carolina) (Finals)	UNC Charlotte
West Coast Athletic Conference	San Francisco	Bill Cartwright, San Francisco	No Tournament		
Western Athletic Conference	Utah	None Selected	No Tournament		

NOTE: From 1975 to 1981, the Eastern College Athletic Conference (ECAC), a loosely organized sports federation of colleges and universities in the Northeastern United States, organized Division I ECAC regional tournaments for those of its members that were independents in basketball. Each 1977 tournament winner received an automatic bid to the 1977 NCAA Men's Division I Basketball Tournament in the same way that the tournament champions of conventional athletic conferences did.

==== Conference standings ====
1976–77 ACC men's basketball standings
	Conf.				Overall
Team	W		L	PCT	W		L	PCT
No. 5 North Carolina†	9	–	3	.750	28	–	5	.848
No. 9 Wake Forest	8	–	4	.667	22	–	8	.733
Clemson	8	–	4	.667	22	–	6	.786
Maryland	7	–	5	.583	19	–	8	.704
NC State	6	–	6	.500	17	–	11	.607
Virginia	2	–	10	.167	12	–	17	.414
Duke	2	–	10	.167	14	–	13	.519
† 1977 ACC tournament winner Rankings from AP Poll

1976–77 Big Eight Conference men's basketball standings
	Conf.				Overall
Team	W		L	PCT	W		L	PCT
No. 16 Kansas State †	11	–	3	.786	23	–	8	.742
Missouri	9	–	5	.643	21	–	8	.724
Oklahoma	9	–	5	.643	18	–	10	.643
Kansas	8	–	6	.571	18	–	10	.643
Nebraska	7	–	7	.500	15	–	14	.517
Colorado	5	–	9	.357	11	–	16	.407
Oklahoma State	4	–	10	.286	10	–	17	.370
Iowa State	3	–	11	.214	7	–	20	.259
† 1977 Big Eight tournament winner Rankings from AP Poll

1976–77 Big Sky men's basketball standings
	Conf.				Overall
Team	W		L	PCT	W		L	PCT
Idaho State †	13	–	1	.929	25	–	5	.833
Weber State	11	–	3	.786	20	–	8	.714
Gonzaga	7	–	7	.500	11	–	16	.407
Montana State	6	–	8	.429	12	–	14	.462
Northern Arizona	5	–	9	.357	12	–	15	.444
Boise State	5	–	9	.357	10	–	16	.385
Montana	5	–	9	.357	7	–	19	.269
Idaho	3	–	11	.214	5	–	21	.192
† Conference tournament winner

1976–77 Big Ten Conference men's basketball standings
	Conf.				Overall
Team	W		L	PCT	W		L	PCT
No. 1 Michigan	16	–	2	.889	26	–	4	.867
Purdue	14	–	4	.778	20	–	8	.714
Iowa	12	–	6	.667	20	–	7	.741
Indiana	11	–	7	.611	16	–	11	.593
Michigan State	9	–	9	.500	12	–	15	.444
Illinois	8	–	10	.444	16	–	14	.533
Wisconsin	7	–	11	.389	11	–	16	.407
Northwestern	7	–	11	.389	9	–	18	.333
Ohio State	6	–	12	.333	11	–	16	.407
No. 13 Minnesota*	0	–	18	.000	0	–	27	.000
Rankings from AP Poll; *Minnesota forfeited all games due to NCAA sanctions. Disputed record (15–3, 24–3)

1976–77 ECC men's basketball standings
	Conf.				Overall
Team	W		L	PCT	W		L	PCT
East
Temple	4	–	1	.800	17	–	11	.607
Hofstra †	4	–	1	.800	23	–	7	.767
La Salle	3	–	2	.600	17	–	12	.586
Saint Joseph's	2	–	3	.400	13	–	13	.500
American	2	–	3	.400	13	–	13	.500
Drexel	0	–	5	.000	11	–	13	.458
West
Lafayette	9	–	1	.900	21	–	6	.778
Delaware	7	–	3	.700	12	–	13	.480
Lehigh	6	–	4	.600	12	–	15	.444
Bucknell	5	–	5	.500	10	–	15	.400
West Chester	2	–	8	.200	11	–	14	.440
Rider	1	–	9	.100	8	–	18	.308
† 1977 ECC tournament winner Rankings from AP Poll

1976–77 Eastern 8 men's basketball standings
	Conf.				Overall
Team	W		L	PCT	W		L	PCT
East
Rutgers	7	–	1	.875	18	–	10	.643
Villanova	6	–	1	.857	23	–	10	.697
George Washington	5	–	3	.625	14	–	12	.538
UMass	3	–	4	.429	20	–	11	.645
West
West Virginia	5	–	5	.500	18	–	11	.621
Penn State	5	–	5	.500	11	–	15	.423
Duquesne †	3	–	7	.300	15	–	15	.500
Pittsburgh	1	–	9	.100	6	–	21	.222
† 1977 Eastern 8 Tournament winner Rankings from AP Poll

1976–77 Ivy League men's basketball standings
	Conf.				Overall
Team	W		L	PCT	W		L	PCT
Princeton	13	–	1	.929	21	–	5	.808
Penn	12	–	2	.857	18	–	8	.692
Columbia	8	–	6	.571	16	–	10	.615
Harvard	6	–	8	.429	9	–	16	.360
Cornell	5	–	9	.357	8	–	18	.308
Brown	5	–	9	.357	6	–	20	.231
Yale	4	–	10	.286	6	–	20	.231
Dartmouth	3	–	11	.214	4	–	22	.154
Rankings from AP Poll

1976–77 Metro Conference men's basketball standings
	Conf.				Overall
Team	W		L	PCT	W		L	PCT
No. 19 Louisville	6	–	1	.857	21	–	7	.750
Cincinnati †	4	–	2	.667	25	–	5	.833
Georgia Tech	3	–	3	.500	13	–	10	.565
Tulane	3	–	3	.500	10	–	17	.370
Memphis State	3	–	4	.429	20	–	9	.690
Saint Louis	1	–	5	.167	7	–	19	.269
Florida State	0	–	2	.000	16	–	11	.593
† 1977 Metro Conference tournament winner Rankings from AP Poll

1976–77 Mid-American Conference men's basketball standings
	Conf.				Overall
Team	W		L	PCT	W		L	PCT
Central Michigan	13	–	3	.813	18	–	10	.643
Miami (Ohio)	13	–	3	.813	20	–	6	.769
Toledo	12	–	4	.750	21	–	6	.778
Northern Illinois	10	–	6	.625	13	–	14	.481
Western Michigan	8	–	8	.500	14	–	13	.519
Ball State	7	–	9	.438	11	–	14	.440
Bowling Green State	5	–	11	.313	9	–	18	.333
Ohio	4	–	12	.250	9	–	17	.346
Eastern Michigan	4	–	12	.250	9	–	18	.333
Kent State	4	–	12	.250	8	–	19	.296
Rankings from AP Poll

1976–77 Missouri Valley Conference men's basketball standings
	Conf.				Overall
Team	W		L	PCT	W		L	PCT
Southern Illinois †	8	–	4	.667	22	–	7	.759
New Mexico State	8	–	4	.667	17	–	10	.630
Wichita State	7	–	5	.583	18	–	10	.643
West Texas State	7	–	5	.583	17	–	13	.567
Drake	5	–	7	.417	10	–	17	.370
Bradley	4	–	8	.333	9	–	18	.333
Tulsa	3	–	9	.250	6	–	21	.222
† 1977 MVC tournament winner Rankings from AP Poll

1976–77 Ohio Valley Conference men's basketball standings
	Conf.				Overall
Team	W		L	PCT	W		L	PCT
Austin Peay State	13	–	1	.929	24	–	4	.857
Middle Tennessee †	9	–	5	.643	20	–	9	.690
Morehead State	9	–	5	.643	15	–	10	.600
Murray State	9	–	5	.643	17	–	10	.630
East Tennessee State	6	–	8	.429	12	–	14	.462
Western Kentucky	6	–	8	.429	10	–	16	.385
Eastern Kentucky	3	–	11	.214	8	–	16	.333
Tennessee Tech	1	–	13	.071	7	–	19	.269
† 1977 OVC tournament winner Rankings from AP Poll

1976–77 Pacific-8 Conference men's basketball standings
	Conf.				Overall
Team	W		L	PCT	W		L	PCT
No. 2 UCLA	11	–	3	.786	24	–	5	.828
Oregon	9	–	5	.643	19	–	10	.655
Washington State	8	–	6	.571	19	–	8	.704
Washington	8	–	6	.571	17	–	10	.630
Oregon State	8	–	6	.571	16	–	13	.552
California	7	–	7	.500	12	–	15	.444
Stanford	3	–	11	.214	11	–	16	.407
USC	2	–	12	.143	6	–	20	.231
As of April 15, 1977; Rankings from AP Poll

1976–77 Pacific Coast Athletic Association men's basketball standings
	Conf.				Overall
Team	W		L	PCT	W		L	PCT
Long Beach State †	9	–	3	.750	21	–	8	.724
San Diego State	9	–	3	.750	13	–	15	.464
San Jose State	8	–	4	.667	18	–	11	.621
Cal State Fullerton	7	–	5	.583	16	–	10	.615
Pacific	5	–	7	.417	11	–	14	.440
UC Santa Barbara	3	–	9	.250	8	–	18	.308
Fresno State	1	–	11	.083	7	–	20	.259
† 1977 PCAA Tournament winner Rankings from AP Poll

1976–77 Southeastern Conference men's basketball standings
	Conf.				Overall
Team	W		L	PCT	W		L	PCT
No. 3 Kentucky	16	–	2	.889	26	–	4	.867
No. 15 Tennessee	16	–	2	.889	22	–	6	.786
No. 11 Alabama	14	–	4	.778	25	–	6	.806
Florida	10	–	8	.556	17	–	9	.654
LSU	8	–	10	.444	15	–	12	.556
Mississippi State	6	–	12	.333	14	–	13	.519
Auburn	6	–	12	.333	13	–	13	.500
Vanderbilt	6	–	12	.333	10	–	16	.385
Ole Miss	5	–	13	.278	11	–	16	.407
Georgia	3	–	15	.167	9	–	18	.333
Rankings from AP Poll

1976–77 Southern Conference men's basketball standings
	Conf.				Overall
Team	W		L	PCT	W		L	PCT
No. 20 VMI †	8	–	2	.800	26	–	4	.867
Furman	8	–	2	.800	18	–	10	.643
Appalachian State	8	–	4	.667	17	–	12	.586
William & Mary	7	–	4	.636	16	–	14	.533
East Carolina	3	–	9	.250	10	–	18	.357
Davidson	2	–	8	.200	5	–	22	.185
The Citadel	2	–	9	.182	8	–	19	.296
† Southern Conference Tournament winner Rankings from AP Poll

1976–77 Southland Conference men's basketball standings
	Conf.				Overall
Team	W		L	PCT	W		L	PCT
Southwestern Louisiana	8	–	2	.800	21	–	8	.724
McNeese State	7	–	3	.700	20	–	7	.741
Lamar	6	–	4	.600	12	–	17	.414
Arkansas State	4	–	6	.400	14	–	13	.519
Louisiana Tech	4	–	6	.400	13	–	13	.500
Texas-Arlington	1	–	9	.100	3	–	24	.111
Rankings from AP Poll

1976–77 Southwest Conference men's basketball standings
	Conf.				Overall
Team	W		L	PCT	W		L	PCT
No. 18 Arkansas†	16	–	0	1.000	26	–	2	.929
Houston	13	–	3	.813	29	–	8	.784
Texas Tech	12	–	4	.750	20	–	9	.690
Texas	8	–	8	.500	13	–	13	.500
Texas A&M	8	–	8	.500	14	–	14	.500
SMU	7	–	9	.438	8	–	19	.296
Baylor	5	–	11	.313	11	–	17	.393
Rice	3	–	13	.188	9	–	18	.333
TCU	0	–	16	.000	3	–	23	.115
† 1977 SWC tournament winner Rankings from AP Poll

1976–77 Sun Belt Conference men's basketball standings
	Conf.				Overall
Team	W		L	PCT	W		L	PCT
No. 17 UNC Charlotte †	5	–	1	.833	28	–	5	.848
New Orleans	4	–	2	.667	18	–	10	.643
South Alabama	3	–	3	.500	17	–	10	.630
Jacksonville	2	–	4	.333	10	–	19	.345
South Florida	2	–	4	.333	9	–	18	.333
Georgia State	2	–	4	.333	10	–	18	.357
† 1977 Sun Belt Conference tournament winner Rankings from AP Poll

1976–77 West Coast Athletic Conference men's basketball standings
	Conf.				Overall
Team	W		L	PCT	W		L	PCT
No. 8 San Francisco	14	–	0	1.000	29	–	2	.935
Santa Clara	9	–	5	.643	17	–	10	.630
Nevada	7	–	7	.500	15	–	12	.556
Seattle	7	–	7	.500	13	–	14	.481
Portland	6	–	8	.429	11	–	15	.423
Pepperdine	5	–	9	.357	13	–	13	.500
Loyola Marymount	4	–	10	.286	11	–	15	.423
Saint Mary's	4	–	10	.286	11	–	16	.407
Rankings from AP Poll

1976–77 WAC men's basketball standings
	Conf.				Overall
Team	W		L	PCT	W		L	PCT
No. 14 Utah	11	–	3	.786	22	–	7	.759
Arizona	11	–	4	.733	21	–	6	.778
New Mexico	8	–	6	.571	19	–	11	.633
Wyoming	8	–	6	.571	17	–	10	.630
Colorado State	6	–	8	.429	13	–	12	.520
Arizona State	6	–	9	.400	15	–	13	.536
BYU	4	–	10	.286	12	–	15	.444
UTEP	3	–	11	.214	11	–	15	.423
Rankings from AP Poll

=== Division I independents ===
A total of 78 college teams played as Division I independents. Among them, UNLV (29–3) had both the best winning percentage (.906) and the most wins.

1976–77 NCAA Division I men's basketball independents standings
	Conf.				Overall
Team	W		L	PCT	W		L	PCT
No. 4 UNLV		–		–	29	–	3	.906
Indiana State		–		–	25	–	3	.893
No. 6 Syracuse		–		–	26	–	4	.867
No. 12 Detroit		–		–	25	–	4	.862
Old Dominion		–		–	25	–	4	.862
Providence		–		–	24	–	5	.828
Holy Cross		–		–	23	–	6	.793
St. Bonaventure		–		–	23	–	6	.793
No. 7 Marquette		–		–	25	–	7	.781
North Texas State		–		–	21	–	6	.778
Illinois State		–		–	22	–	7	.759
No. 10 Notre Dame		–		–	22	–	7	.759
Creighton		–		–	21	–	7	.750
Oral Roberts		–		–	21	–	7	.750
Army		–		–	20	–	8	.714
St. John's		–		–	22	–	9	.710
Milwaukee		–		–	19	–	8	.704
Georgetown		–		–	19	–	9	.679
Virginia Tech		–		–	19	–	10	.655
James Madison		–		–	17	–	9	.654
Northwestern State		–		–	17	–	9	.654
Texas–Pan American		–		–	17	–	9	.654
Connecticut		–		–	17	–	10	.630
Seton Hall		–		–	18	–	11	.621
UNC Wilmington		–		–	16	–	10	.615
Portland State		–		–	16	–	10	.615
Iona		–		–	15	–	10	.600
Dayton		–		–	16	–	11	.593
Fairfield		–		–	16	–	11	.593
Georgia Southern		–		–	16	–	11	.593
Richmond		–		–	15	–	11	.577
Saint Francis (PA)		–		–	15	–	11	.577
DePaul		–		–	15	–	12	.556
Northeast Louisiana		–		–	15	–	12	.556
Stetson		–		–	15	–	12	.556
Utah State		–		–	15	–	12	.556
Colgate		–		–	13	–	11	.542
Navy		–		–	13	–	11	.542
Oklahoma City		–		–	14	–	12	.538
South Carolina		–		–	14	–	12	.538
Valparaiso		–		–	13	–	12	.520
Catholic		–		–	13	–	13	.500
Fairleigh Dickinson		–		–	13	–	13	.500
Loyola (IL)		–		–	13	–	13	.500
Maine		–		–	13	–	13	.500
Niagara		–		–	13	–	13	.500
Rhode Island		–		–	13	–	13	.500
Saint Peter's		–		–	13	–	13	.500
VCU		–		–	13	–	13	.500
Butler		–		–	13	–	14	.481
Manhattan		–		–	13	–	14	.481
New Hampshire		–		–	12	–	14	.462
Northeastern		–		–	12	–	14	.462
St. Francis (NY)		–		–	12	–	14	.462
Air Force		–		–	12	–	15	.444
Denver		–		–	12	–	15	.444
Southern Mississippi		–		–	11	–	16	.407
Siena		–		–	9	–	15	.375
Cleveland State		–		–	10	–	17	.370
Xavier		–		–	10	–	17	.370
Centenary (LA)		–		–	11	–	19	.367
Long Island		–		–	9	–	16	.360
Hawaii		–		–	9	–	18	.333
Western Carolina		–		–	8	–	16	.333
Vermont		–		–	8	–	17	.320
Boston College		–		–	8	–	18	.308
Baptist		–		–	8	–	19	.296
Marshall		–		–	8	–	19	.296
Boston University		–		–	7	–	19	.269
Robert Morris		–		–	7	–	19	.269
Samford		–		–	7	–	19	.269
Mercer		–		–	6	–	19	.240
Hardin–Simmons		–		–	6	–	21	.222
Houston Baptist		–		–	6	–	23	.207
Buffalo		–		–	5	–	21	.192
Fordham		–		–	5	–	21	.192
Wagner		–		–	3	–	21	.125
Canisius		–		–	3	–	22	.120
Rankings from AP Poll

=== Informal championships ===
Conference	Regular season winner	Most Valuable Player
New Jersey-New York 7 Conference	Columbia & Seton Hall	None selected

Columbia and Seton Hall both finished with 3–2 records in head-to-head competition among members of the New Jersey-New York 7 Conference.

Conference	Regular season winner	Most Valuable Player
Philadelphia Big 5	Penn & Temple	Keven McDonald, Penn

Penn and Temple both finished with 3–1 records in head-to-head competition among the Philadelphia Big 5.

=== Statistical leaders ===
Points per game			Rebounds per game			Assists per game			True Shooting Percentage		
Player	School	PPG	Player	School	RPG	Player	School	FG%	Player	School	TS%
Freeman Williams	Portland State	38.8	Glenn Mosley	Seton Hall	16.3	Jeff Jonas	Utah	10.7	Cedric Maxwell	Charlotte	.682
Anthony Roberts	Oral Roberts	34.0	John Irving	Hofstra	16.3	Kenny Higgs	LSU	8.9	Dave Montgomery	VMI	.680
Larry Bird	Indiana State	32.8	Robert Elmore	Wichita State	15.8	Johnny Darden	Tennessee	8.2	Joe Senser	West Chester	.670
Otis Birdsong	Houston	30.3	Bob Stephens	Drexel	14.8	Nick Pappageorge	Saint Mary's	7.9	Frank Sowinski	Princeton	.669
Rich Laurel	Hofstra	30.3	Mark Landsberger	Arizona State	14.4	Oscar Williams	Utah State	7.7	Sidney Moncrief	Arkansas	.667

== Post-season tournaments ==
=== NCAA tournament ===
==== Final Four ====
National semifinals
E	North Carolina	84
W	UNLV	83
ME	UNC Charlotte	49
MW	Marquette	51

National finals
E	North Carolina	59
MW	Marquette	67
Third place
W	UNLV	106
ME	UNC Charlotte	94

=== National Invitation tournament ===
==== Semifinals & finals ====
Semifinals
Alabama	76
Houston	82
Villanova	82
St. Bonaventure	86

Finals
Houston	91
St. Bonaventure	94
Third place
Alabama	89
Villanova	102

== Awards ==
=== Consensus All-American teams ===
Consensus First Team
Player	Position	Class	Team
Kent Benson	C	Senior	Indiana
Otis Birdsong	G	Senior	Houston
Phil Ford	G	Junior	North Carolina
Rickey Green	G	Senior	Michigan
Marques Johnson	F	Senior	UCLA
Bernard King	F	Junior	Tennessee

Consensus Second Team
Player	Position	Class	Team
Greg Ballard	F	Senior	Oregon
Bill Cartwright	C	Sophomore	San Francisco
Rod Griffin	G	Junior	Wake Forest
Ernie Grunfeld	F	Senior	Tennessee
Phil Hubbard	F	Senior	Michigan
Butch Lee	G	Junior	Marquette
Mychal Thompson	F/C	Junior	Minnesota

=== Major player of the year awards ===
- Wooden Award: Marques Johnson, UCLA
- Naismith Award: Marques Johnson, UCLA
- Helms Player of the Year: Marques Johnson, UCLA
- Associated Press Player of the Year: Marques Johnson, UCLA
- UPI Player of the Year: Marques Johnson, UCLA
- NABC Player of the Year: Marques Johnson, UCLA
- Oscar Robertson Trophy (USBWA): Marques Johnson, UCLA
- Adolph Rupp Trophy: Marques Johnson, UCLA
- Sporting News Player of the Year: Marques Johnson, UCLA

=== Major coach of the year awards ===
- Associated Press Coach of the Year: Bob Gaillard, San Francisco
- Henry Iba Award (USBWA): Eddie Sutton, Arkansas
- NABC Coach of the Year: Dean Smith, North Carolina
- UPI Coach of the Year: Bob Gaillard, San Francisco
- Sporting News Coach of the Year: Lee Rose, UNC Charlotte

=== Other major awards ===
- Frances Pomeroy Naismith Award (Best player under 6'0): Jeff Jonas, Utah
- Robert V. Geasey Trophy (Top player in Philadelphia Big 5): Keven McDonald, Penn
- NIT/Haggerty Award (Top player in New York City metro area): Rich Laurel, Hofstra

== Coaching changes ==
A number of teams changed coaches during the season and after it ended.

Team	Former Coach	Interim Coach	New Coach	Reason
Austin Peay	Lake Kelly		Ed Thompson	
Ball State	Jim Holstein		Steve Yoder	
Baylor	Carroll Dawson		Jim Haller	
Boston College	Bob Zuffelato		Tom Davis	
Butler	George Theofanis		Joe Sexson	
Canisius	Johnny McCarthy		Nick Macarchuk	
Connecticut	Dee Rowe		Dom Perno	
Denver	Al Harden		Bill Weimar	
Detroit	Dick Vitale		Smokey Gaines	
Drexel	Ray Haesler		Eddie Burke	
East Carolina	Dave Patton		Larry Gillman	
Fresno State	Ed Gregory		Boyd Grant	
Georgia Southern	Larry Chapman		J. B. Scearce	
Georgia State	Jack Waters		Roger Couch	
Hardin–Simmons	Preston Vice		Jim Shuler	
Harvard	Satch Sanders		Frank McLaughlin	
Houston Baptist	Bob McKinley		Gene Iba	
Idaho State	Jim Killingsworth		Lynn Archibald	Killingworth left to coach Oklahoma State.
Lafayette	Tom Davis		Roy Chipman	Davis left to coach Boston College.
Louisiana Tech	Emmett Hendricks		J. D. Barnett	
Marquette	Al McGuire		Hank Raymonds	
Marshall	Bob Daniels		Stu Aberdeen	
McNeese State	E. W. Foy		Glenn Duhon	
Mississippi State	Kermit Davis Sr.		Ron Greene	
New Orleans	Ron Greene		Butch van Breda Kolff	Greene left to coach Mississippi State.
Oklahoma State	Guy R. Strong		Jim Killingsworth	
Oral Roberts	Jerry Hale		Lake Kelly	
Penn	Chuck Daly		Bob Weinhauer	
Rice	Bob Polk		Mike Schuler	
Saint Louis	Randy Albrecht		Ron Coleman	
Saint Peter's	Dick McDonald		Bob Kelly	
TCU	Johnny Swaim		Tim Somerville	
Tennessee	Ray Mears	Cliff Wettig		
UCLA	Gene Bartow		Gary Cunningham	
Western Carolina	Fred Conley		Steve Cottrell	
