= 1976–77 NCAA Division I men's basketball rankings =

- Season: 1976–77
- NCAA Tournament: 1977
- Preseason No. 1: Michigan
- NCAA Tournament Champions: Marquette
NCAA Division I men's basketball rankings


The 1976–77 NCAA Division I men's basketball rankings was made up of two human polls, the AP Poll and the Coaches Poll, in addition to various other preseason polls.

== Legend ==
	Increase in ranking
	Decrease in ranking
	New to rankings from previous week
Italics	Number of first place votes
(#–#)	Win–loss record
т	Tied with team above or below also with this symbol

== AP Poll ==
	Preseason	Week 1 Nov. 29	Week 2 Dec. 6	Week 3 Dec. 13	Week 4 Dec. 20	Week 5 Dec. 27	Week 6 Jan. 3	Week 7 Jan. 10	Week 8 Jan. 17	Week 9 Jan. 24	Week 10 Jan. 31	Week 11 Feb. 7	Week 12 Feb. 14	Week 13 Feb. 21	Week 14 Feb. 28	Week 15 Mar. 7	Final Mar. 14	
1.	Michigan (21)	Michigan (1–0)	Michigan (2–0)	Michigan (3–0)	Michigan (4–0)	Michigan (5–0)	San Francisco (15–0)	San Francisco (17–0)	San Francisco (19–0)	San Francisco (19–0)	San Francisco (21–0)	San Francisco (23–0)	San Francisco (25–0)	San Francisco (27–0) (50)	San Francisco (29–0)	Michigan (24–3)	Michigan (25–3)	1.
2.	Marquette (6)	Marquette (0–0)	Marquette (1–0)	Marquette (4–0)	Notre Dame (6–0)	Notre Dame (7–0)	Cincinnati (9–0)	Kentucky (9–1)	Cincinnati (11–0)	Michigan (13–1)	UCLA (15–2)	UCLA (18–2)	Kentucky (18–2)	Kentucky (20–2) (2)	Kentucky (22–2)	UCLA (23–4)	UCLA (24–4)	2.
3.	North Carolina (9)	UCLA (2–0)	UCLA (3–0)	Kentucky (4–0)	San Francisco (10–0)	San Francisco (12–0)	Kentucky (7–1)	Cincinnati (10–0)	Alabama (14–0)	Alabama (14–1)	Kentucky (14–2)	Kentucky (16–2)	UCLA (19–3)	Michigan (20–3)	Michigan (21–3)	San Francisco (29–1)	Kentucky (25–3)	3.
4.	UCLA (2)	Indiana (1–0)	Kentucky (2–0)	Notre Dame (5–0)	Cincinnati (7–0)	Alabama (6–0)	Alabama (9–0)	Alabama (12–0)	North Carolina (10–1)	North Carolina (11–2)	UNLV (13–1)	Wake Forest (18–2)	Alabama (19–2)	UNLV (22–2)	UCLA (22–4)	North Carolina (25–4)	UNLV (26–2)	4.
5.	Indiana (7)	Kentucky (1–0)	UNLV (3–0)	San Francisco (7–0)	Alabama (6–0)	Cincinnati (7–0)	Michigan (6–1)	North Carolina (8–1)	Michigan (10–1)	UNLV (13–1)	Wake Forest (16–2)	Michigan (17–2)	Michigan (18–3)	UCLA (20–4)	UNLV (23–2)	UNLV (25–2)	North Carolina (25–4)	5.
6.	Kentucky (2)	UNLV (1–0)	San Francisco (4–0)	Cincinnati (5–0)	Marquette (4–1)	Kentucky (6–1)	North Carolina (6–1)	Michigan (9–1)	Kentucky (10–2)	Kentucky (12–2)	Marquette (14–2)	Louisville (16–2)	UNLV (20–2)	Arkansas (24–1)	North Carolina (22–4)	Kentucky (23–3)	Syracuse (26–3)	6.
7.	UNLV	Louisville (0–0)	Notre Dame (3–0)	Alabama (4–0)	Kentucky (6–1)	Wake Forest (7–0)	UCLA (9–1)	Wake Forest (11–1)	UNLV (11–1)	Tennessee (13–2)	Michigan (15–2)	Alabama (17–2)	Wake Forest (19–3)	Tennessee (19–4)	Arkansas (25–1)	Tennessee (21–5)	Marquette (21–7)	7.
8.	Maryland	Notre Dame (1–0)	Cincinnati (3–0)	Arizona (7–0)	UCLA (5–1)	UCLA (7–1)	Notre Dame (7–1)	UNLV (10–1)	Marquette (10–2)	UCLA (13–2)	Alabama (15–2)	Minnesota (16–1)	Louisville (18–3)	Alabama (19–3)	Providence (24–3)	Arkansas (26–1)	San Francisco (29–2)	8.
9.	Louisville (1)	North Carolina (1–1)	Arizona (4–0)	UCLA (3–1)	Wake Forest (6–0)	North Carolina (5–1)	UNLV (10–1)	Minnesota (10–0)	Wake Forest (12–2)	Marquette (13–2)	Louisville (15–2)	Marquette (14–2)	Marquette (16–3)	North Carolina (18–4)	Minnesota (22–3)	Minnesota (24–3)	Wake Forest (23–6)	9.
10.	Arizona	San Francisco (3–0)	Alabama (4–0)	Wake Forest (5–0)	North Carolina (4–1)	Clemson (7–0)	Wake Forest (9–1)	Arizona (11–1)	UCLA (13–2)	Wake Forest (14–2)	Minnesota (15–1)	UNLV (15–2)	Cincinnati (18–3)	Louisville (19–4)	Louisville (21–5)	Syracuse (25–3)	Notre Dame (21–6)	10.
11.	San Francisco (1)	Arizona (1–0)	Wake Forest (4–0)	North Carolina (4–1)	Clemson (7–0)	UNLV (8–1)	Arizona (10–1)	Marquette (9–2)	Minnesota (11–1)	Louisville (12–2)	Tennessee (14–2)	Tennessee (16–3)	Arkansas (22–1)	Wake Forest (20–4)	Tennessee (20–5)	Cincinnati (25–4)	Alabama (25–4)	11.
12.	Cincinnati	Cincinnati (0–0)	North Carolina (2–1)	UNLV (4–1)	UNLV (6–1)	Marquette (4–2)	Marquette (7–2)	UCLA (11–2)	Louisville (10–2)	Cincinnati (12–2)	Cincinnati (14–2)	Cincinnati (15–3)	Minnesota (18–2)	Providence (22–3)	Alabama (20–4)	Alabama (22–4)	Detroit (25–3)	12.
13.	Alabama	Alabama (1–0)	Indiana (1–1)	Clemson (4–0)	Louisville (4–2)	Arizona (8–1)	Minnesota (9–0)	Louisville (9–2)	Maryland (12–2)	Minnesota (12–1)	North Carolina (11–4)	Arkansas (19–1)	North Carolina (17–4)	Minnesota (20–3)	Syracuse (23–3)	Providence (24–4)	Minnesota (22–3)	13.
14.	Notre Dame	Wake Forest (2–0)	Louisville (1–1)	Maryland (3–1)	Arizona (7–1)	Louisville (5–2)	Louisville (7–2)	Maryland (11–2)	Tennessee (11–2)	Providence (15–2)	Arkansas (17–1)	North Carolina (13–4)	Tennessee (17–4)	Cincinnati (19–4)	Cincinnati (22–4)	Louisville (21–6)	Utah (22–6)	14.
15.	NC State	Tennessee (1–0)	Tennessee (2–0)	Syracuse (6–1)	Maryland (6–1)	Minnesota (8–0)	Maryland (9–1)	Providence (11–2)	Providence (13–2)	Arkansas (14–1)	Providence (17–2)	Clemson (17–3)	Detroit (20–1)	Syracuse (21–3)	Detroit (24–2)	Notre Dame (20–6)	Tennessee (22–6)	15.
16.	Tennessee	Maryland (0–1)	Clemson (4–0)	Indiana (1–2)	Utah (5–3)	Maryland (7–1)	Clemson (9–1)	Arkansas (10–1)	Arizona (12–2)	Arizona (14–2)	Clemson (15–3)	Providence (18–2)	Providence (20–3)	Detroit (22–2)	Wake Forest (20–6)	Marquette (20–7)	Kansas State (23–7)	16.
17.	Rutgers	Southern Illinois (1–0)	Maryland (3–1)	Louisville (3–2)	Syracuse (7–1)	Arkansas (8–0)	Providence (8–2)	Clemson (10–2)	Arkansas (12–1)	Syracuse (14–2)	Syracuse (16–2)	Syracuse (18–2)	Arizona (18–3)	Oregon (17–7)	Arizona (21–4)	Detroit (24–3)	UNC Charlotte (24–3)	17.
18.	DePaul	DePaul (0–1)	Southern Illinois (3–0)	Southern Illinois (5–1)	Arkansas (6–0)	Syracuse (7–1)	Arkansas (8–1)	Memphis State (13–1)	Memphis State (14–1)	Purdue (11–4)	Purdue (13–4)	Arizona (16–3)	Clemson (18–4)	Marquette (16–6)	Clemson (21–5)	UNC Charlotte (23–3)	Arkansas (26–2)	18.
19.	UNC Charlotte	Rutgers (0–0)	DePaul (2–1)	Arkansas (5–0)	Tennessee (5–2)	Utah (6–3)	Syracuse (8–2)	Notre Dame (7–3)	Purdue (10–3)	Clemson (13–3)	Arizona (15–3)	Detroit (18–1)	VMI (21–1)	Clemson (19–5)	Marquette (18–6)	Utah (21–6)	Louisville (21–7)	19.
20.	Missouri	UNC Charlotte (1–0)	Syracuse (3–1)	St. John's (5–0)	Minnesota (6–0)	Auburn (5–0)	Memphis State (10–1)	Oregon (11–2)	Syracuse (13–2)	Memphis State (16–2)	Detroit (16–1)	VMI (18–1)	Syracuse (19–3)	Utah (19–5)	Utah (20–6)	Arizona (21–5)	VMI (26–3)	20.
	Preseason	Week 1 Nov. 29	Week 2 Dec. 6	Week 3 Dec. 13	Week 4 Dec. 20	Week 5 Dec. 27	Week 6 Jan. 3	Week 7 Jan. 10	Week 8 Jan. 17	Week 9 Jan. 24	Week 10 Jan. 31	Week 11 Feb. 7	Week 12 Feb. 14	Week 13 Feb. 21	Week 14 Feb. 28	Week 15 Mar. 7	Final Mar. 14	
		Dropped: NC State; Missouri	Dropped: Rutgers; UNC Charlotte	Dropped: Tennessee; DePaul	Dropped: Indiana; Southern Illinois; St. John's	Dropped: Tennessee	Dropped: Utah (9–3); Auburn	Dropped: Syracuse	Dropped: Clemson; Notre Dame; Oregon	Dropped: Maryland	Dropped: Memphis State	Dropped: Purdue	None	Dropped: VMI	Dropped: Oregon	Dropped: Wake Forest; Clemson	Dropped: Cincinnati; Providence; Arizona	

== UPI Poll ==
	Preseason	Week 2 Dec. 6	Week 3 Dec. 13	Week 4 Dec. 20	Week 5 Dec. 27	Week 6 Jan. 3	Week 7 Jan. 10	Week 8 Jan. 17	Week 9 Jan. 24	Week 10 Jan. 31	Week 11 Feb. 7	Week 12 Feb. 14	Week 13 Feb. 21	Week 14 Feb. 28	Final Mar. 7	
1.	Marquette	Michigan (2–0)	Michigan (3–0)	Michigan (4–0)	Michigan (5–0)	San Francisco (15–0)	San Francisco (17–0)	San Francisco (19–0)	San Francisco (19–0)	San Francisco (21–0)	San Francisco (23–0)	San Francisco (25–0)	San Francisco (27–0)	San Francisco (29–0)	Michigan (24–3)	1.
2.	Michigan	Marquette (1–0)	Marquette (4–0)	Notre Dame (6–0)	Notre Dame (7–0)	Kentucky (7–1)	Cincinnati (10–0)	North Carolina (10–1)	Michigan (13–1)	UCLA (15–2)	UCLA (18–2)	Kentucky (18–2)	Kentucky (20–2)	Kentucky (22–2)	San Francisco (29–1)	2.
3.	North Carolina	UCLA (3–0)	Kentucky (1–0)	San Francisco (10–0)	San Francisco (12–0)	Michigan (6–1)	Kentucky (9–1)	Cincinnati (11–0)	North Carolina (11–2)	UNLV (13–1)	Louisville (16–2)	UCLA (19–3)	Michigan (20–3)	Michigan (21–3)	North Carolina (25–4)	3.
4.	UCLA	UNLV (3–0)	Notre Dame (5–0)	Alabama (6–0)	Alabama (6–0)	Cincinnati (9–0)	Alabama (12–0)	Alabama (14–0)	Alabama (14–1)	Marquette (14–2)	Michigan (17–2)	Michigan (18–3)	UNLV (22–2)	UCLA (22–4)	UCLA (23–4)	4.
5.	Indiana	Kentucky (2–0)	San Francisco (7–0)	Marquette (4–1)	Cincinnati (7–0)	Alabama (9–0)	North Carolina (8–1)	Michigan (10–1)	UNLV (13–1)	Michigan (15–2)	Kentucky (16–2)	Louisville (18–3)	Tennessee (19–4)	North Carolina (22–4)	Kentucky (23–3)	5.
6.	Kentucky	Alabama (4–0)	North Carolina (4–1)	Cincinnati (7–0)	North Carolina (5–1)	UCLA (9–1)	Michigan (9–1)	UNLV (11–1)	Tennessee (13–2)	Kentucky (14–2)	Wake Forest (18–2)	Marquette (16–3)	UCLA (20–4)	UNLV (23–2)	UNLV (25–2)	6.
7.	UNLV	Arizona (4–0)	Alabama (4–0)	Kentucky (6–1)	Kentucky (6–1)	North Carolina (6–1)	UNLV (10–1)	Kentucky (10–2)	Kentucky (12–2)	Louisville (15–2)	Marquette (14–2)	UNLV (20–2)	Arkansas (24–1)	Arkansas (25–1)	Arkansas (26–1)	7.
8.	Louisville	San Francisco (4–0)	Arizona (7–0)	UCLA (5–1)	UCLA (7–1)	Notre Dame (7–1)	Wake Forest (11–1)	Marquette (10–2)	Marquette (13–2)	Wake Forest (16–2)	UNLV (15–2)	Alabama (19–2)	North Carolina (18–4)	Providence (24–3)	Tennessee (21–5)	8.
9.	Arizona	North Carolina (2–1)	Cincinnati (5–0)	North Carolina (4–1)	UNLV (8–1)	UNLV (10–1)	Marquette (9–2)	Wake Forest (12–2)	UCLA (13–2)	Alabama (15–2)	Alabama (17–2)	Wake Forest (19–3)	Wake Forest (20–4)	Louisville (21–5)	Syracuse (25–3)	9.
10.	Cincinnati	Cincinnati (3–0)	UCLA (3–1)	Clemson (7–0)	Wake Forest (7–0)	Arizona (10–1)	Arizona (11–1)	UCLA (13–2)	Louisville (12–2)	Tennessee (14–2)	Tennessee (16–3)	Arkansas (22–1)	Louisville (19–4)	Tennessee (20–5)	Utah (21–6)	10.
11.	Maryland	Notre Dame (3–0)	UNLV (4–1)	UNLV (6–1)	Clemson (7–0)	Marquette (7–2)	Minnesota (10–0)	Tennessee (11–2)	Wake Forest (14–2)	Cincinnati (14–2)	Cincinnati (15–3)	North Carolina (17–4)	Alabama (19–3)	Syracuse (23–3)	Kansas State (22–7)	11.
12.	San Francisco	Indiana (1–1)	Wake Forest (5–0)	Wake Forest (6–0)	Minnesota (8–0)	Minnesota (9–0)	UCLA (11–2)	Purdue (10–3)	Cincinnati (12–2)	North Carolina (11–4)	Arkansas (19–1) т	Cincinnati (18–3)	Providence (22–3)	Alabama (20–4)	Cincinnati (25–4)	12.
13.	Tennessee	Tennessee (2–0)	Maryland (3–1)	Louisville (4–2)	Arizona (8–1)	Wake Forest (9–1)	Purdue (8–3)	Minnesota (11–1)	Arizona (14–2)	Arkansas (17–1)	North Carolina (13–4) т	Tennessee (17–4)	Syracuse (21–3)	Minnesota (22–3)	Louisville (21–6)	13.
14.	NC State	Wake Forest (4–0)	Clemson (4–0)	Arizona (7–1)	Marquette (4–2)	Providence (8–2)	Louisville (9–2)	Arizona (12–2)	Minnesota (12–1)	Purdue (13–4)	Minnesota (16–1)	Arizona (18–3)	Utah (19–5)	Wake Forest (20–6)	Marquette (20–7)	14.
15.	Missouri	Maryland (3–1)	Syracuse (6–1)	Utah (5–3)	Louisville (5–2)	Clemson (9–1)	Oregon (11–2)	Arkansas (12–1)	Providence (15–2)	Arizona (15–3)	Arizona (16–3)	Minnesota (18–2)	Creighton (21–3)	Arizona (21–4)	Providence (24–4)	15.
16.	Wichita State	Louisville (1–1)	Southern Illinois (5–1)	Minnesota (6–0)	Maryland (7–1)	Louisville (7–2)	Arkansas (10–1)	Louisville (10–2)	Arkansas (14–1)	Minnesota (15–1)	Providence (18–2)	Providence (20–3)	Minnesota (20–3)	Indiana State (23–2)	Indiana State (25–2)	16.
17.	Georgetown	Washington (3–0)	Purdue (4–2)	Syracuse (7–1)	Arkansas (8–0)	Missouri (9–2)	Tennessee (8–2)	Providence (13–2)	Purdue (11–4)	Providence (17–2)	Utah (16–4)	Notre Dame (15–5)	Cincinnati (19–4)	Detroit (24–2)	Minnesota (22–3)	17.
18.	Rutgers	Southern Illinois (3–0)	Minnesota (4–0)	Oregon (5–1)	Syracuse (7–1)	Maryland (9–1) т	Providence (11–2)	Maryland (12–2)	Oregon (12–4)	Clemson (15–3)	Missouri (17–4)	Syracuse (19–3)	Detroit (22–2)	Houston (24–6)	Alabama (22–4)	18.
19.	Penn	Oregon (2–1)	Indiana (1–2)	Missouri (6–2)	Iowa (7–0)	Purdue (6–3) т	Holy Cross (10–1) т	Memphis State (14–1)	Indiana State (16–1)	Missouri (16–3)	Syracuse (18–2)	Detroit (20–1)	Houston (22–6) т	Oral Roberts (21–5)	Detroit (24–3)	19.
20.	Purdue	Clemson (4–0)	Oregon (3–1)	Georgetown (4–0)	Oregon (5–1)	Utah (9–3)	St. John's (9–2) т	Utah (12–3)	Missouri (14–3)	Utah (15–4)	Clemson (17–3)	Clemson (18–4)	Oral Roberts (20–5) т	Cincinnati (22–4)	Purdue (19–8)	20.
	Preseason	Week 2 Dec. 6	Week 3 Dec. 13	Week 4 Dec. 20	Week 5 Dec. 27	Week 6 Jan. 3	Week 7 Jan. 10	Week 8 Jan. 17	Week 9 Jan. 24	Week 10 Jan. 31	Week 11 Feb. 7	Week 12 Feb. 14	Week 13 Feb. 21	Week 14 Feb. 28	Final Mar. 7	
		Dropped: NC State; Missouri; Wichita State; Georgetown; Rutgers; Penn; Purdue	Dropped: Tennessee; Louisville; Washington	Dropped: Maryland; Southern Illinois; Purdue; Indiana	Dropped: Utah; Missouri; Georgetown	Dropped: Arkansas; Syracuse; Iowa; Oregon	Dropped: Notre Dame; Clemson; Missouri; Maryland; Utah	Dropped: Oregon; Holy Cross; St. John's	Dropped: Maryland; Memphis State; Utah	Dropped: Oregon; Indiana State	Dropped: Purdue	Dropped: Utah; Missouri	Dropped: Marquette; Arizona; Notre Dame; Clemson	Dropped: Utah; Creighton	Dropped: Wake Forest; Arizona; Houston; Oral Roberts	
