= Purdue Boilermakers men's basketball statistical leaders =

The Purdue Boilermakers men's basketball statistical leaders are individual statistical leaders of the Purdue Boilermakers men's basketball program in various categories, including points, three-pointers, assists, blocks, rebounds, and steals. Within those areas, the lists identify single-game, single-season, and career leaders. The Boilermakers represent Purdue University in the NCAA's Big Ten Conference.

Purdue began competing in intercollegiate basketball in 1896. However, the school's record book does not generally list records from before the 1950s, as records from before this period are often incomplete and inconsistent. Since scoring was much lower in this era, and teams played much fewer games during a typical season, it is likely that few or no players from this era would appear on these lists anyway.

The NCAA did not officially record assists as a stat until the 1983–84 season, and blocks and steals until the 1985–86 season, but Purdue's record books includes players in these stats before these seasons. These lists are updated through Purdue's 2025–26 season.

== Scoring ==
Career
Rk	Player	Points	Seasons
1	Zach Edey	2,516	2020–21 2021–22 2022–23 2023–24
2	Rick Mount	2,323	1967–68 1968–69 1969–70
3	Joe Barry Carroll	2,179	1976–77 1977–78 1978–79 1979–80
4	E’Twaun Moore	2,136	2007–08 2008–09 2009–10 2010–11
5	Dave Schellhase	2,074	1963–64 1964–65 1965–66
6	Troy Lewis	2,038	1984–85 1985–86 1986–87 1987–88
7	Terry Dischinger	1,979	1959–60 1960–61 1961–62
8	Braden Smith	1,932	2022–23 2023–24 2024–25 2025–26
9	Carsen Edwards	1,920	2016–17 2017–18 2018–19
10	JaJuan Johnson	1,919	2007–08 2008–09 2009–10 2010–11

Season
Rk	Player	Points	Season
1	Glenn Robinson	1,030	1993–94
2	Zach Edey	983	2023–24
3	Rick Mount	932	1968–69
4	Carsen Edwards	874	2018–19
5	Joe Barry Carroll	798	1978–79
6	Dave Schellhase	781	1965–66
7	Zach Edey	757	2022–23
8	Joe Barry Carroll	736	1979–80
9	Terry Dischinger	726	1961–62
10	Trey Kaufman-Renn	723	2024–25

Single game
Rk	Player	Points	Season	Opponent
1	Rick Mount	61	1969–70	Iowa
2	Dave Schellhase	57	1965–66	Michigan
3	Rick Mount	53	1969–70	Michigan
	Rick Mount	53	1969–70	Iowa
5	Terry Dischinger	52	1960–61	Michigan State
6	Terry Dischinger	50	1961–62	Wisconsin
7	Glenn Robinson	49	1993–94	Illinois
8	Terry Dischinger	47	1961–62	Indiana
9	Terry Dischinger	46	1961–62	Minnesota
10	Rick Mount	45	1968–69	Michigan
	Rick Mount	45	1968–69	Iowa
	Terry Dischinger	45	1961–62	Illinois
	Terry Dischinger	45	1961–62	Illinois

== Rebounds ==
Career
Rk	Player	Rebounds	Seasons
1	Zach Edey	1,321	2020–21 2021–22 2022–23 2023–24
2	Joe Barry Carroll	1,148	1976–77 1977–78 1978–79 1979–80
3	Terry Dischinger	958	1959–60 1960–61 1961–62
4	A.J. Hammons	930	2012-13 2013-14 2014-15 2015-16
5	Trevion Williams	905	2018-19 2019-20 2020-21 2021-22
6	Walter Jordan	882	1974–75 1975–76 1976–77 1977–78
7	Robbie Hummel	862	2007–08 2008–09 2009–10 2010–11 2011–12
	Brad Miller	862	1994–95 1995–96 1996–97 1997–98
9	JaJuan Johnson	854	2007–08 2008–09 2009–10 2010–11
10	Vince Edwards	779	2014–15 2015–16 2016–17 2017–18

Season
Rk	Player	Rebounds	Season
1	Zach Edey	474	2023–24
2	Zach Edey	438	2022–23
3	Caleb Swanigan	436	2016–17
4	Joe Barry Carroll	352	1978–79
5	Glenn Robinson	344	1993–94
6	Terry Dischinger	328	1959–60
7	Terry Dischinger	322	1961–62
8	Terry Dischinger	308	1960–61
	Trey Kaufman-Renn	308	2025–26
10	Frank Kendrick	303	1973–74

Single game
Rk	Player	Rebounds	Season	Opponent
1	Carl McNulty	27	1950–51	Minnesota
2	Terry Dischinger	26	1959–60	Wisconsin
3	Terry Dischinger	24	1961–62	Illinois
4	Bob Fehrman	23	1958–59	South Dakota
5	Zach Edey	22	2022–23	Minnesota
	Caleb Swanigan	22	2016–17	Minnesota
	Bill Jones	22	1963–64	Illinois
	Terry Dischinger	22	1961–62	Minnesota
	Terry Dischinger	22	1959–60	Butler
10	Caleb Swanigan	21	2016–17	Western Illinois
	William Franklin	21	1971–72	Northwestern
	William Franklin	21	1971–72	Ohio State
	George Faerber	21	1969–70	Tulsa
	Bill Jones	21	1963–64	Northwestern
	Dave Schellhase	21	1963–64	Notre Dame
	Bill Jones	21	1962–63	Minnesota
	Zach Edey	21	2023–24	Grambling

== Assists ==
NCAA Division I record

Career
Rk	Player	Assists	Seasons
1	Braden Smith	1,103	2022–23 2023–24 2024–25 2025–26
2	Bruce Parkinson	690	1972–73 1973–74 1974–75 1975–76 1976–77
3	Brian Walker	572	1978–79 1979–80 1980–81
4	Tony Jones	481	1986–87 1987–88 1988–89 1989–90
	Everette Stephens	481	1984–85 1985–86 1986–87 1987–88
6	Porter Roberts	464	1992–93 1993–94 1994–95 1995–96
7	Matt Waddell	460	1991–92 1992–93 1993–94 1994–95
8	Lewis Jackson	456	2008–09 2009–10 2010–11 2011–12
9	Eugene Parker	424	1974–75 1975–76 1976–77 1977–78
10	Steve Reid	416	1982–83 1983–84 1984–85

Season
Rk	Player	Assists	Season
1	Braden Smith	345	2025-26
2	Braden Smith	313	2024-25
3	Braden Smith	292	2023-24
4	Bruce Parkinson	207	1974–75
5	Brian Walker	205	1980–81
6	Brian Walker	198	1978–79
7	Everette Stephens	190	1986–87
8	Bruce Parkinson	183	1973–74
9	Everette Stephens	180	1987–88
10	Mack Gadis	178	1985–86

Single game
Rk	Player	Assists	Season	Opponent
1	Bruce Parkinson	18	1974–75	Minnesota
2	Braden Smith	16	2025-26	Northwestern
	Braden Smith	16	2023-24	Northwestern
4	Braden Smith	15	2024-25	Houston
	Braden Smith	15	2024-25	Texas A&M-CC
	Braden Smith	15	2023-24	Gonzaga
	Brian Walker	15	1978–79	Michigan State
8	Braden Smith	14	2025-26	Auburn
	Braden Smith	14	2025-26	Penn State
	Braden Smith	14	2024-25	Nebraska
	Braden Smith	14	2024-25	Rutgers
	Troy Lewis	14	1987–88	Indiana
	Bruce Parkinson	14	1972–73	Indiana

== Steals ==
Career
Rk	Player	Steals	Seasons
1	Chris Kramer	274	2006–07 2007–08 2008–09 2009–10
2	Brian Cardinal	259	1996–97 1997–98 1998–99 1999–2000
3	Braden Smith	249	2022–23 2023–24 2024–25 2025–26
4	Brian Walker	187	1978–79 1979–80 1980–81
5	Jaraan Cornell	176	1996–97 1997–98 1998–99 1999–2000
6	Ricky Hall	172	1980–81 1981–82 1982–83 1983–84
7	E’Twaun Moore	164	2007–08 2008–09 2009–10 2010–11
8	Everette Stephens	161	1984–85 1985–86 1986–87 1987–88
9	Drake Morris	149	1977–78 1978–79 1979–80 1980–81
10	Brad Miller	145	1994–95 1995–96 1996–97 1997–98

Season
Rk	Player	Steals	Season
1	Brian Walker	88	1978–79
2	Braden Smith	78	2024–25
	Brian Cardinal	78	1998–99
4	Chris Kramer	75	2008–09
	Chris Kramer	75	2007–08
6	Ricky Hall	67	1982–83
7	Braden Smith	66	2025–26
8	Brian Cardinal	65	1999–2000
	Brian Cardinal	65	1997–98
	Bruce Parkinson	65	1976–77

Single game
Rk	Player	Steals	Season	Opponent
1	Ricky Hall	8	1983–84	Louisville
2	Braden Smith	7	2022-23	Milwaukee
	Brian Cardinal	7	1998–99	South Carolina
	Bruce Parkinson	7	1976–77	Indiana
5	Braden Smith	6	2024-25	Indiana
	E'Twaun Moore	6	2008–09	Arkansas-Pine Bluff
	Chris Kramer	6	2007–08	Northwestern
	Carl Landry	6	2006–07	Minnesota
	Chris Kramer	6	2006–07	Penn State
	Chris Kramer	6	2006–07	Wagner
	Jaraan Cornell	6	1999–2000	Minnesota
	Brad Miller	6	1997–98	Delaware
	Brian Cardinal	6	1997–98	Indiana
	Roy Hairston	6	1994–95	Western Michigan
	Brian Walker	6	1979–80	Michigan State
	Brian Walker	6	1979–80	Tulsa

== Blocks ==
Career
Rk	Player	Blocks	Seasons
1	Joe Barry Carroll	349	1976–77 1977–78 1978–79 1979–80
2	A.J. Hammons	343	2012-13 2013-14 2014-15 2015-16
3	JaJuan Johnson	263	2007–08 2008–09 2009–10 2010–11
4	Zach Edey	232	2020–21 2021–22 2022–23 2023–24
5	Matt Haarms	210	2017–18 2018–19 2019–20
6	Russell Cross	175	1980–81 1981–82 1982–83
7	John Allison	165	1998–99 1999–00 2000–01 2001–02
8	Brad Miller	163	1994–95 1995–96 1996–97 1997–98
9	Isaac Haas	124	2014–15 2015–16 2016–17 2017–18
10	Brandon Brantley	114	1991–92 1993–94 1994–95 1995–96

Season
Rk	Player	Blocks	Season
1	Joe Barry Carroll	105	1977–78
2	A.J. Hammons	96	2014-15
	A.J. Hammons	96	2013-14
4	Joe Barry Carroll	92	1979–80
5	Zach Edey	84	2023–24
	A.J. Hammons	84	2015-16
7	Joe Barry Carroll	82	1976–77
8	Matt Haarms	79	2017–18
	JaJuan Johnson	79	2010–11
10	JaJuan Johnson	78	2008–09

Single game
Rk	Player	Blocks	Season	Opponent
1	Joe Barry Carroll	11	1977–78	Arizona
2	Joe Barry Carroll	9	1977–78	Northwestern
3	A.J. Hammons	8	2015-16	Michigan State
	A.J. Hammons	8	2014-15	Indiana
5	Zach Edey	7	2022–23	Nebraska
	A.J. Hammons	7	2015-16	Vanderbilt
	A.J. Hammons	7	2014-15	Ohio State
	A.J. Hammons	7	2013-14	Central Connecticut State
	JaJuan Johnson	7	2010–11	Michigan State
	JaJuan Johnson	7	2008–09	Northwestern
	Joe Barry Carroll	7	1977–78	Alabama
