= 1976–77 Wisconsin Badgers men's basketball team =

American college basketball season

1976–77 Wisconsin Badgers men's basketball
- Conference: Big Ten Conference
- Record: 11–16 (7–11 Big Ten)
- Head coach: Bill Cofield (1st season)
- Home arena: UW Fieldhouse

1976–77 Big Ten Conference men's basketball standings
	Conf.				Overall
Team	W		L	PCT	W		L	PCT
No. 1 Michigan	16	–	2	.889	26	–	4	.867
Purdue	14	–	4	.778	20	–	8	.714
Iowa	12	–	6	.667	20	–	7	.741
Indiana	11	–	7	.611	16	–	11	.593
Michigan State	9	–	9	.500	12	–	15	.444
Illinois	8	–	10	.444	16	–	14	.533
Wisconsin	7	–	11	.389	11	–	16	.407
Northwestern	7	–	11	.389	9	–	18	.333
Ohio State	6	–	12	.333	11	–	16	.407
No. 13 Minnesota*	0	–	18	.000	0	–	27	.000
Rankings from AP Poll; *Minnesota forfeited all games due to NCAA sanctions. Disputed record (15–3, 24–3)

The 1976–77 Wisconsin Badgers men's basketball team represented University of Wisconsin–Madison. The head coach was Bill Cofield, coaching in his first season after replacing John Powless. The team played their home games at the UW Fieldhouse in Madison, Wisconsin and was a member of the Big Ten Conference.

== Schedule ==
Date time, TV	Rank^{#}	Opponent^{#}	Result	Record	Site city, state
November 27, 1976*		at No. 6 Kentucky	L 64–72	0–1	Rupp Arena; Lexington, KY
December 2, 1976*		Saint Mary's	W 82–76	1–1	UW Fieldhouse; Madison, WI
December 6, 1976*		No. 19 DePaul	W 68–66	2–1	UW Fieldhouse; Madison, WI
December 11, 1976*		at Stanford	L 66–70	2–2	Maples Pavilion; Stanford, CA
December 13, 1976*		at Northern Illinois	L 57–81	2–3	Chick Evans Field House; DeKalb, IL
December 15, 1976*		Loyola	W 71–68	3–3	UW Fieldhouse; Madison, WI
December 27, 1976*		vs. Boston College; Milwaukee Classic	W 74–66	4–3	MECCA Arena; Milwaukee, WI
December 28, 1976*		at No. 12 Marquette; Milwaukee Classic / Rivalry	L 57–64	4–4	MECCA Arena (10,938); Milwaukee, WI
January 6, 1977		at Michigan State	L 61–84	4–5 (0–1)	Jenison Fieldhouse; East Lansing, MI
January 8, 1977		at No. 5 Michigan	L 63–66	4–6 (0–2)	Crisler Arena; Ann Arbor, MI
January 13, 1977		Ohio State	L 58–60	4–7 (0–3)	UW Fieldhouse; Madison, WI
January 15, 1977		Indiana	L 64–79	4–8 (0–4)	UW Fieldhouse; Madison, WI
January 15, 1977		Northwestern	W 61–60	5–8 (1–4)	UW Fieldhouse; Madison, WI
January 22, 1977		at No. 11 Minnesota	L 64–82^	6–8 (2–4)	Williams Arena; Minneapolis, MN
January 22, 1977		at No. 18 Purdue	L 71–81	6–9 (2–5)	Mackey Arena; West Lafayette, IN
January 27, 1977		No. 2 Michigan	L 64–69	6–10 (2–6)	UW Fieldhouse; Madison, WI
January 29, 1977		Michigan State	W 87–83 ^{3OT}	7–10 (3–6)	UW Fieldhouse; Madison, WI
February 3, 1977		at Illinois	L 72–82	7–11 (3–7)	Assembly Hall; Champaign, IL
February 5, 1977		at Iowa	L 73–90	7–12 (3–8)	Iowa Field House; Iowa City, IA
February 10, 1977		Purdue	W 76–74	8–12 (4–8)	UW Fieldhouse; Madison, WI
February 12, 1977		Illinois	W 62–50	9–12 (5–8)	UW Fieldhouse; Madison, WI
February 19, 1977		at Northwestern	L 88–98	9–13 (5–9)	McGaw Memorial Hall; Evanston, IL
February 21, 1977*		No. 18 Marquette; Rivalry	L 58–73	9–14	UW Fieldhouse; Madison, WI
February 24, 1977		at Indiana	W 66–64	10–14 (6–9)	Simon Skjodt Assembly Hall; Bloomington, IN
February 26, 1977		at Ohio State	L 80–92 ^{OT}	10–15 (6–10)	St. John Arena; Columbus, OH
March 2, 1977*		No. 9 Minnesota	L 61–64^	11–15 (7–10)	UW Fieldhouse; Madison, WI
March 5, 1977*		No. 9 Iowa	L 93–94 ^{2OT}	11–16 (7–11)	UW Fieldhouse; Madison, WI
*Non-conference game. ^{#}Rankings from AP Poll. (#) Tournament seedings in parentheses. All times are in Central Time.

== Notes ==
^ January 22/March 3: Minnesota forfeited these games, thus Wisconsin has been credited with wins in those games.
