= 1976–77 St. John's Redmen basketball team =

American college basketball season

1976–77 St. John's Redmen men's basketball

Lapchick Memorial Champions ECAC Metro tournament Champions

1977 NCAA tournament, First round
- Conference: Independent
- Record: 22–9
- Head coach: Lou Carnesecca
- Assistant coaches: John Kresse; Brian Mahoney
- Captain: Glen Williams
- Home arena: Alumni Hall; Madison Square Garden

The 1976–77 St. John's Redmen basketball team represented St. John's University during the 1976–77 NCAA Division I men's basketball season. The team was coached by Lou Carnesecca in his ninth year at the school. St. John's home games are played at Alumni Hall and Madison Square Garden.

The Redmen won the ECAC Metro tournament after beating Seton Hall in the final.

== Roster ==
1976–77 St. John's Red Storm men's basketball team
Players
Coaches

Pos.	#	Name	Height	Weight	Year	Previous school	Hometown
G/F	-	Gordon Thomas	6 ft 4 in (1.93 m)	—	So	Bay Shore	Bay Shore, NY
G	-	Bernard Rencher (redshirt)	6 ft 1 in (1.85 m)	—	So	Mater Christi/Notre Dame	Elmhurst, NY
G	-	Bill Clarke	6 ft 2 in (1.88 m)	—	Jr	Archbishop Molloy	Rosedale, NY
G/F	-	Kevelin Winfree	6 ft 5 in (1.96 m)	—	Jr	Alexander Hamilton	Brooklyn, NY
F	-	Wayne Hall	6 ft 7 in (2.01 m)	—	So
G	-	Reggie Carter (redshirt)	6 ft 3 in (1.91 m)	—	So	Long Island Lutheran/Hawaii	New York, NY
G	4	Tom Calabrese	6 ft 0 in (1.83 m)	—	So	Cliffside Park	Cliffside Park, NJ
F	24	George Johnson	6 ft 7 in (2.01 m)	—	Jr	New Utrecht	Brooklyn, NY
G/F	32	Glen Williams (C)	6 ft 4 in (1.93 m)	—	Sr	Laurinburg Prep	St. Thomas, USVI
C	33	Paul Berwanger	6 ft 10 in (2.08 m)	—	RS Jr	Cornwall Central/Boston College	Cornwall, NY
F	35	Cecil Rellford	6 ft 6 in (1.98 m)	—	RS Sr	Suncoast/Kentucky State	Riviera Beach, FL
F	44	Rudy Wright	6 ft 7 in (2.01 m)	—	So	Long Island City	Queens, NY
C	52	Tom Weadock	6 ft 11 in (2.11 m)	—	RS Sr	Power Memorial\San Jacinto	New York, NY

Head coach

- Lou Carnesecca (St. John's, '50)

Assistant coach(es)

- John Kresse (St. John's, '64)
- Brian Mahoney (Manhattan, '71)

Legend

- (C) Team captain
- (S) Suspended
- (I) Ineligible
- (W) Walk-on
- Injured
- Current redshirt

== Schedule and results ==
Date time, TV	Rank^{#}	Opponent^{#}	Result	Record	Site city, state
Regular season
11/26/76*		Brown; Lapchick Tournament Opening Round	W 79-65	1-0	Alumni Hall; Queens, NY
11/27/76*		Fairfield; Lapchick tournament championship	W 87-65	2-0	Alumni Hall; Queens, NY
11/30/76*		vs. Davidson	W 58-57	3-0	Charlotte Coliseum; Charlotte, NC
12/04/76*		Vanderbilt	W 63-53	4-0	Alumni Hall; Queens, NY
12/11/76*		Rutgers	W 86-70	5-0	Alumni Hall; Queens, NY
12/17/76*	No. 20	vs. Southern Methodist; Volunteer Classic	W 87-71	6-0	Stokely Athletic Center; Knoxville, TN
12/18/76*	No. 20	at Tennessee; Volunteer Classic	L 81-86	6-1	Stokely Athletic Center; Knoxville, TN
12/28/76*		vs. No. 3 San Francisco; Rainbow Classic	L 70-80	6-2	Neil S. Blaisdell Center; Honolulu, HI
12/29/76*		vs. Temple; Rainbow Classic	W 59-49	7-2	Neil S. Blaisdell Center; Honolulu, HI
12/30/76*		vs. Illinois; Rainbow Classic	W 56-52	8-2	Neil S. Blaisdell Center; Honolulu, HI
01/08/77*		Rhode Island	W 82-67	9-2	Alumni Hall; Queens, NY
01/10/77*		at Iona	L 66-68	9-3	Hynes Athletic Center; New Rochelle, NY
01/12/77*		at St. Joseph's	W 74-57	10-3	The Palestra; Philadelphia, PA
01/15/77*		Manhattan	L 67-71	10-4	Alumni Hall; Queens, NY
01/19/77*		Temple	W 66-50	11-4	Alumni Hall; Queens, NY
01/22/77*		Princeton	W 75-50	12-4	Alumni Hall; Queens, NY
01/25/77*		Villanova	L 63-65	12-5	Villanova Field House; Villanova, PA
01/29/77*		Oregon	W 61-51	13-5	Alumni Hall; Queens, NY
02/02/77*		Georgetown	W 82-66	14-5	Alumni Hall; Queens, NY
02/05/77*		Niagara	W 72-66	15-5	Alumni Hall; Queens, NY
02/09/77*		at Army	W 57-55 ^{OT}	16-5	USMA Fieldhouse; West Point, NY
02/12/77*		at Fordham	W 83-63	17-5	Rose Hill Gymnasium; Bronx, NY
02/15/77*		at Seton Hall	L 69-75	17-6	Walsh Gymnasium; South Orange, NJ
02/19/77*		at No. 20 Syracuse	L 55-79	17-7	Manley Field House; Syracuse, NY
02/21/77*		Howard	W 92-69	18-7	Alumni Hall; Queens, NY
02/23/77*		Boston College	W 92-69	19-7	Alumni Hall; Queens, NY
02/26/77*		No. 12 Providence	L 66-69	19-8	Alumni Hall; Queens, NY
02/28/77*		at Holy Cross	W 62-61	20-8	Hart Recreation Center; Worcester, MA
ECAC Metro tournament
03/03/77		vs. Manhattan; ECAC Metro Semifinal	W 73-64	21-8	Rose Hill Gymnasium; Bronx, NY
03/03/77		vs. Seton Hall; ECAC Metro Final	W 83-73	22-8	Madison Square Garden; New York, NY
NCAA tournament
03/12/77*		vs. No. 19 Utah; NCAA Regional Quarterfinal	L 68-72	22-9	McKale Center; Tucson, AZ
*Non-conference game. ^{#}Rankings from AP Poll. (#) Tournament seedings in parentheses.

== Team players drafted into the NBA ==
Round	Pick	Player	NBA club
2	27	Glen Williams	Milwaukee Bucks
5	93	Cecil Rellford	Phoenix Suns
7	140	Tom Weadock	New York Knicks
