= 1976–77 Washington Huskies men's basketball team =

American college basketball season

1976–77 Washington Huskies men's basketball
- Conference: Pacific-8 Conference
- Record: 17–10 (8–6 Pac-8)
- Head coach: Marv Harshman (6th season)
- Assistant coach: Bob Johnson
- Home arena: Hec Edmundson Pavilion

1976–77 Pacific-8 Conference men's basketball standings
	Conf.				Overall
Team	W		L	PCT	W		L	PCT
No. 2 UCLA	11	–	3	.786	24	–	5	.828
Oregon	9	–	5	.643	19	–	10	.655
Washington State	8	–	6	.571	19	–	8	.704
Washington	8	–	6	.571	17	–	10	.630
Oregon State	8	–	6	.571	16	–	13	.552
California	7	–	7	.500	12	–	15	.444
Stanford	3	–	11	.214	11	–	16	.407
USC	2	–	12	.143	6	–	20	.231
As of April 15, 1977; Rankings from AP Poll

The 1976–77 Washington Huskies men's basketball team represented the University of Washington for the 1976–77 NCAA Division I men's basketball season. Led by sixth-year head coach Marv Harshman, the Huskies were members of the Pacific-8 Conference and played their home games on campus at Hec Edmundson Pavilion in Seattle, Washington.

The Huskies were 17–10 overall in the regular season and 8–6 in conference play, tied for third in the standings.
