= 1976–77 Syracuse Orangemen basketball team =

American college basketball season

1976–77 Syracuse Orangemen basketball

NCAA Tournament, Regional semifinal
- Conference: Independent

Ranking
- Coaches: No. 9
- AP: No. 6
- Record: 26–4
- Head coach: Jim Boeheim (1st season)
- Assistant coaches: Rick Pitino (1st season); Bernie Fine (1st season)
- Home arena: Manley Field House

1976–77 NCAA Division I men's basketball independents standings
	Conf.				Overall
Team	W		L	PCT	W		L	PCT
No. 4 UNLV		–		–	29	–	3	.906
Indiana State		–		–	25	–	3	.893
No. 6 Syracuse		–		–	26	–	4	.867
No. 12 Detroit		–		–	25	–	4	.862
Old Dominion		–		–	25	–	4	.862
Providence		–		–	24	–	5	.828
Holy Cross		–		–	23	–	6	.793
St. Bonaventure		–		–	23	–	6	.793
No. 7 Marquette		–		–	25	–	7	.781
North Texas State		–		–	21	–	6	.778
Illinois State		–		–	22	–	7	.759
No. 10 Notre Dame		–		–	22	–	7	.759
Creighton		–		–	21	–	7	.750
Oral Roberts		–		–	21	–	7	.750
Army		–		–	20	–	8	.714
St. John's		–		–	22	–	9	.710
Milwaukee		–		–	19	–	8	.704
Georgetown		–		–	19	–	9	.679
Virginia Tech		–		–	19	–	10	.655
James Madison		–		–	17	–	9	.654
Northwestern State		–		–	17	–	9	.654
Texas–Pan American		–		–	17	–	9	.654
Connecticut		–		–	17	–	10	.630
Seton Hall		–		–	18	–	11	.621
UNC Wilmington		–		–	16	–	10	.615
Portland State		–		–	16	–	10	.615
Iona		–		–	15	–	10	.600
Dayton		–		–	16	–	11	.593
Fairfield		–		–	16	–	11	.593
Georgia Southern		–		–	16	–	11	.593
Richmond		–		–	15	–	11	.577
Saint Francis (PA)		–		–	15	–	11	.577
DePaul		–		–	15	–	12	.556
Northeast Louisiana		–		–	15	–	12	.556
Stetson		–		–	15	–	12	.556
Utah State		–		–	15	–	12	.556
Colgate		–		–	13	–	11	.542
Navy		–		–	13	–	11	.542
Oklahoma City		–		–	14	–	12	.538
South Carolina		–		–	14	–	12	.538
Valparaiso		–		–	13	–	12	.520
Catholic		–		–	13	–	13	.500
Fairleigh Dickinson		–		–	13	–	13	.500
Loyola (IL)		–		–	13	–	13	.500
Maine		–		–	13	–	13	.500
Niagara		–		–	13	–	13	.500
Rhode Island		–		–	13	–	13	.500
Saint Peter's		–		–	13	–	13	.500
VCU		–		–	13	–	13	.500
Butler		–		–	13	–	14	.481
Manhattan		–		–	13	–	14	.481
New Hampshire		–		–	12	–	14	.462
Northeastern		–		–	12	–	14	.462
St. Francis (NY)		–		–	12	–	14	.462
Air Force		–		–	12	–	15	.444
Denver		–		–	12	–	15	.444
Southern Mississippi		–		–	11	–	16	.407
Siena		–		–	9	–	15	.375
Cleveland State		–		–	10	–	17	.370
Xavier		–		–	10	–	17	.370
Centenary (LA)		–		–	11	–	19	.367
Long Island		–		–	9	–	16	.360
Hawaii		–		–	9	–	18	.333
Western Carolina		–		–	8	–	16	.333
Vermont		–		–	8	–	17	.320
Boston College		–		–	8	–	18	.308
Baptist		–		–	8	–	19	.296
Marshall		–		–	8	–	19	.296
Boston University		–		–	7	–	19	.269
Robert Morris		–		–	7	–	19	.269
Samford		–		–	7	–	19	.269
Mercer		–		–	6	–	19	.240
Hardin–Simmons		–		–	6	–	21	.222
Houston Baptist		–		–	6	–	23	.207
Buffalo		–		–	5	–	21	.192
Fordham		–		–	5	–	21	.192
Wagner		–		–	3	–	21	.125
Canisius		–		–	3	–	22	.120
Rankings from AP Poll

The 1976–77 Syracuse Orangemen basketball team represented Syracuse University during the 1976–77 NCAA men's basketball season. The team was led by first year head coach Jim Boeheim.

== Roster ==
1976–77 Syracuse Orangemen men's basketball team
Players
Coaches

Pos.	#	Name	Height	Weight	Year	Hometown
G	10	Hal Cohen	6 ft 0 in (1.83 m)	170 lb (77 kg)	Fr	Canton, New York
G	11	Larry Kelley	6 ft 0 in (1.83 m)	—	Sr	New Haven, Connecticut
G	20	Ross Kindel	6 ft 2 in (1.88 m)	—	Jr	Roselle, New Jersey
G	22	Jimmy "Bug" Williams	5 ft 10 in (1.78 m)	—	Sr	Buffalo, New York
G	24	Cliff Warwell	6 ft 5 in (1.96 m)	—	Fr	Candor, New York
F	32	Reggie Powell	6 ft 6 in (1.98 m)	—	So	Fayetteville, North Carolina
G/F	33	Dale Shackleford	6 ft 6 in (1.98 m)	200 lb (91 kg)	So	Utica, New York
G/F	35	Bill Drew	6 ft 5 in (1.96 m)	—	Jr	Commack, New York
G/F	42	Kevin James	6 ft 3 in (1.91 m)	—	Jr	Brookville, New York
F/C	44	Marty Byrnes	6 ft 7 in (2.01 m)	210 lb (95 kg)	Jr	Pittsford, New York
C	50	Roosevelt Bouie	6 ft 11 in (2.11 m)	215 lb (98 kg)	Fr	Kendall, New York
C	53	Bob Parker	6 ft 9 in (2.06 m)	—	Sr	Irondequoit, New York
F	55	Louis Orr	6 ft 8 in (2.03 m)	175 lb (79 kg)	Fr	Cincinnati, Ohio

Head coach

- Jim Boeheim

Assistant coach(es)

- Rick Pitino

Legend

- (C) Team captain
- (S) Suspended
- (I) Ineligible
- (W) Walk-on
- Injured
- Current redshirt

== Schedule and results ==
Date time, TV	Rank^{#}	Opponent^{#}	Result	Record	High points	High rebounds	High assists	Site (attendance) city, state
Regular season
Nov 26, 1976*		vs. Harvard; Tip-Off Classic	W 75–48	1–0	–	–	–	Springfield Civic Center; Springfield, Massachusetts
Nov 27, 1976*		vs. West Virginia; Tip-Off Classic	L 78–83	1–1	–	–	–	Springfield Civic Center; Springfield, Massachusetts
Dec 1, 1976*		Colgate	W 109–73	2–1	–	–	–	Manley Field House; Syracuse, New York
Dec 4, 1976*		at No. 7 Louisville	W 76–75	3–1	–	–	–	Freedom Hall; Louisville, Kentucky
Dec 7, 1976*	No. 20	at Boston College	W 67–54	4–1	–	–	–	Roberts Center; Boston, Massachusetts
Dec 9, 1976*	No. 20	at Biscayne	W 87–63	5–1	–	–	–	Manley Field House; Syracuse, New York
Dec 11, 1976*	No. 20	at Canisius	W 74–59	6–1	–	–	–	Buffalo Memorial Auditorium; Buffalo, New York
Dec 13, 1976*	No. 15	Penn State	W 101–63	7–1	–	–	–	Manley Field House; Syracuse, New York
Dec 28, 1976*	No. 17	vs. Duquesne; Maryland Invitational	W 116–86	8–1	–	–	–	Cole Fieldhouse; College Park, Maryland
Dec 29, 1976*	No. 17	at No. 16 Maryland; Maryland Invitational	L 85–96	8–2	–	–	–	Cole Fieldhouse; College Park, Maryland
Jan 3, 1977*	No. 19	at Cornell	W 93–61	9–2	–	–	–	Barton Hall; Ithaca, New York
Jan 5, 1977*	No. 19	at Fordham	W 87–68	10–2	–	–	–	Rose Hill Gym; Bronx, New York
Jan 8, 1977*	No. 19	American	W 90–68	11–2	–	–	–	Manley Field House; Syracuse, New York
Jan 12, 1977*		at Penn State	W 82–66	12–2	–	–	–	Rec Hall; University Park, Pennsylvania
Jan 15, 1977*		West Virginia	W 86–71	13–2	–	–	–	Manley Field House; Syracuse, New York
Jan 22, 1977*	No. 20	Pittsburgh	W 96–74	14–2	–	–	–	Manley Field House; Syracuse, New York
Jan 24, 1977*	No. 17	Buffalo	W 91–71	15–2	–	–	–	Manley Field House; Syracuse, New York
Jan 26, 1977*	No. 17	at Temple	W 76–67	16–2	–	–	–	McGonigle Hall; Philadelphia, Pennsylvania
Feb 3, 1977*	No. 17	Buffalo State	W 100–63	17–2	–	–	–	Manley Field House; Syracuse, New York
Feb 5, 1977*	No. 17	Northeastern	W 110–70	18–2	–	–	–	Manley Field House; Syracuse, New York
Feb 7, 1977*	No. 17	Bentley	W 104–86	19–2	–	–	–	Manley Field House; Syracuse, New York
Feb 12, 1977*	No. 17	at St. Bonaventure	L 84–91	19–3	–	–	–	Reilly Center; St. Bonaventure, New York
Feb 17, 1977*	No. 20	at Rhode Island	W 70–47	20–3	–	–	–	Keaney Gymnasium; Kingston, Rhode Island
Feb 19, 1977*	No. 20	St. John's	W 79–55	21–3	–	–	–	Manley Field House; Syracuse, New York
Feb 23, 1977*	No. 15	Niagara	W 106–82	22–3	–	–	–	Manley Field House; Syracuse, New York
Feb 26, 1977*	No. 15	Rutgers	W 82–72	23–3	–	–	–	Manley Field House; Syracuse, New York
ECAC Tournament
Mar 6, 1977*	No. 13	St. Bonaventure; ECAC Tournament – Upstate	W 85–72	24–3	–	–	–	Manley Field House; Syracuse, New York
Mar 7, 1977*	No. 13	at Old Dominion; ECAC Tournament – Upstate/Southern Championship	W 67–64	25–3	–	–	–	Norfolk Scope; Norfolk, Virginia
NCAA Tournament
Mar 13, 1977*	(ME) No. 10	(ME) No. 7 Tennessee; NCAA Tournament • First round	W 93–88 ^{OT}	26–3	–	–	–	Maravich Assembly Center; Baton Rouge, Louisiana
Mar 17, 1977*	(ME) No. 6	(ME) No. 17 UNC Charlotte; NCAA Tournament • Regional semifinal	L 59–81	26–4	–	–	–	Rupp Arena; Lexington, Kentucky
*Non-conference game. ^{#}Rankings from AP Poll. (#) Tournament seedings in parentheses. ME=Mideast.
