= 1976–77 Princeton Tigers men's basketball team =

American college basketball season

1976–77 Princeton Tigers men's basketball

Ivy League Champion

1977 NCAA Men's Division I Basketball Tournament, Regional Quarterfinals
- Conference: Ivy League
- Record: 21–5 (13–1, 1st Ivy)
- Head coach: Pete Carril (10th season)
- Captain: Robert Slaughter
- Home arena: Jadwin Gymnasium

1976–77 Ivy League men's basketball standings
	Conf.				Overall
Team	W		L	PCT	W		L	PCT
Princeton	13	–	1	.929	21	–	5	.808
Penn	12	–	2	.857	18	–	8	.692
Columbia	8	–	6	.571	16	–	10	.615
Harvard	6	–	8	.429	9	–	16	.360
Cornell	5	–	9	.357	8	–	18	.308
Brown	5	–	9	.357	6	–	20	.231
Yale	4	–	10	.286	6	–	20	.231
Dartmouth	3	–	11	.214	4	–	22	.154
Rankings from AP Poll

The 1976–77 Princeton Tigers men's basketball team represented Princeton University in intercollegiate college basketball during the 1976–77 NCAA Division I men's basketball season. The head coach was Pete Carril and the team captain was Robert Slaughter. The team played its home games in the Jadwin Gymnasium on the university campus in Princeton, New Jersey. The team was the champion of the Ivy League, which earned them an invitation to the 32-team 1977 NCAA Men's Division I Basketball Tournament.

The team posted a 21–5 overall record and a 13–1 conference record. The team's January 3, 1977, victory over Notre Dame was the last home win against a ranked opponent until the 2011–12 team's defeated Harvard on February 11, 2012. The team's only conference loss came in the rivalry game on January 11, 1977, against the Penn Quakers at The Palestra in Philadelphia, Pennsylvania, by a 43–39 margin. The team lost its next game against the St. John's Red Storm before winning twelve in a row heading into the NCAA Men's Division I Basketball Tournament. The team lost its March 12, 1977 NCAA Men's Division I Basketball Tournament East Regional first-round game against the Kentucky Wildcats 72–58 at The Palestra.

The team was led by first team All-Ivy League selection Frank Sowinski, who was named Ivy League Men's Basketball Player of the Year, and by Ivy League Men's Basketball Co-Rookie of the Year Bob Roma. Sowinski led the league in field goal percentage with a 65.0% average. His percentages of 63.2% overall and 65.0% in conference games were Ivy League single-season records that stood for two years. The team was the second of nineteen Princeton teams and the second in a row to win the national statistical championship in scoring defense with an average of 51.7 points allowed. That was an NCAA record (since 1965) that surpassed the team's prior season record of 52.9 and that would stand for three years.

== Regular season ==
The team posted a 21–5 (13–1 Ivy League) record.

11/27 COLGATE	W	95–48
12/1 NAVY	W	52–36
12/4 (16) Maryland	L	45–58
12/11 ST. JOSEPH'S	W	46–43
12/14 Villanova	W	77–74
12/20 Rutgers	L	54–59
12/28 Ohio State !	W	67–62
12/29 St. Bonaventure !	W	59–55
1/3 (2) NOTRE DAME	W	76–62
1/7 HARVARD	W	77–45
1/8 DARTMOUTH	W	63–32
1/11 Pennsylvania	L	39–43
1/22 St. John's	L	50–75
1/26 William & Mary	W	42–38
1/29 PENNSYLVANIA	W	69–56
2/4 Yale	W	56–42
2/5 Brown	W	70–52
2/11 CORNELL	W	62–49
2/12 COLUMBIA	W	85–64
2/18 Dartmouth	W	65–45
2/19 Harvard	W	59–49
2/27 Columbia	W	66–49
2/28 Cornell	W	69–56
3/4 BROWN	W	63–40
3/5 YALE	W	61–39
3/12 (6) Kentucky @	L	58–72

! = Kodak Classic at Rochester, N.Y. @ = NCAA first round at Philadelphia
