= 1976–77 Kentucky Wildcats men's basketball team =

1976–77 season of University of Kentucky men's basketball team

1976–77 Kentucky Wildcats men's basketball

SEC co-champion

NCAA Tournament, Regional Final
- Conference: Southeastern Conference

Ranking
- Coaches: No. 5
- AP: No. 3
- Record: 26–4 (16–2 SEC)
- Head coach: Joe B. Hall (5th season)
- Captains: Merion Haskins; Larry Johnson
- Home arena: Rupp Arena

1976–77 Southeastern Conference men's basketball standings
	Conf.				Overall
Team	W		L	PCT	W		L	PCT
No. 3 Kentucky	16	–	2	.889	26	–	4	.867
No. 15 Tennessee	16	–	2	.889	22	–	6	.786
No. 11 Alabama	14	–	4	.778	25	–	6	.806
Florida	10	–	8	.556	17	–	9	.654
LSU	8	–	10	.444	15	–	12	.556
Mississippi State	6	–	12	.333	14	–	13	.519
Auburn	6	–	12	.333	13	–	13	.500
Vanderbilt	6	–	12	.333	10	–	16	.385
Ole Miss	5	–	13	.278	11	–	16	.407
Georgia	3	–	15	.167	9	–	18	.333
Rankings from AP Poll

The 1976–77 Kentucky Wildcats men's basketball team represented University of Kentucky in the 1976–77 NCAA Division I men's basketball season. This was the first season Kentucky played in Rupp Arena. Kentucky finished with an overall record of 26–4 (16–2 SEC) In the 1977 NCAA Tournament Kentucky was placed in the East Regional with games in Philadelphia and College Park. After wins vs Princeton and VMI the Wildcats faced North Carolina in the East Regional Final. Kentucky trailed the Tar Heels by twelve at half and their comeback came up short as they lost 79–72

== Schedule ==
Date time, TV	Rank^{#}	Opponent^{#}	Result	Record	High points	High rebounds	High assists	Site (attendance) city, state
November 27, 1976*	No. 6	Wisconsin	W 72–64		–	–	–	
December 2, 1976*	No. 5	TCU	W 103–53		–	–	–	
December 6, 1976*	No. 5	at No. 4 Indiana; Indiana–Kentucky rivalry	W 66–51		–	–	–	Assembly Hall; Bloomington, IN
December 11, 1976*	No. 4	Kansas	W 90–63		–	–	–	Rupp Arena; Lexington, KY
December 13, 1976*	No. 4	at South Carolina	W 98–67		–	–	–	
December 17, 1976*	No. 3	Bowling Green; UK Invitation Tournament	W 77–59		–	–	–	
December 18, 1976*	No. 3	Utah; UK Invitation Tournament	L 68–70		–	–	–	
December 30, 1976*	No. 6	vs. No. 2 Notre Dame	W 102–78		–	–	–	Freedom Hall; Louisville, KY
January 3, 1977	No. 6	Georgia	W 64–59 ^{OT}		–	–	–	
January 8, 1977	No. 3	at Vanderbilt	W 64–62		–	–	–	
January 12, 1977	No. 2	Tennessee	L 67–71 ^{OT}		–	–	–	
January 15, 1977	No. 2	at Auburn	W 75–68		–	–	–	
January 17, 1977	No. 2	at Florida	W 73–71		–	–	–	
January 22, 1977	No. 6	LSU	W 87–72		–	–	–	
January 24, 1977	No. 6	Ole Miss	W 100–73		–	–	–	
January 29, 1977	No. 6	at No. 3 Alabama	W 87–85		–	–	–	
January 31, 1977	No. 6	at Mississippi St	W 92–85		–	–	–	
February 5, 1977	No. 3	Vanderbilt	W 113–73		–	–	–	
February 7, 1977*	No. 3	vs. Florida St	W 97–57		–	–	–	Freedom Hall; Louisville, KY
February 12, 1977	No. 3	Auburn	W 89–82		–	–	–	
February 14, 1977	No. 3	Florida	W 104–78		–	–	–	
February 19, 1977	No. 2	at LSU	W 90–76		–	–	–	
February 21, 1977	No. 2	at Ole Miss	W 81–69		–	–	–	
February 26, 1977	No. 2	No. 8 Alabama	W 85–70		–	–	–	
February 28, 1977	No. 2	Mississippi St	W 77–64		–	–	–	
March 5, 1977	No. 2	at No. 11 Tennessee	L 79–81		–	–	–	
March 7, 1977	No. 2	Georgia	W 72–54		–	–	–	
March 12, 1977*	No. 3	vs. Princeton; NCAA Tournament • First round	W 72–58		–	–	–	The Palestra; Philadelphia, PA
March 17, 1977*	No. 3	vs. No. 20 VMI; NCAA Tournament • East Regional semifinal	W 93–78		–	–	–	Cole Field House; College Park, MD
March 19, 1977*	No. 3	vs. No. 5 North Carolina; NCAA Tournament • East Regional Final	L 72–79		–	–	–	Cole Field House; College Park, MD
*Non-conference game. ^{#}Rankings from AP Poll. (#) Tournament seedings in parentheses.
