= 1976–77 Michigan State Spartans men's basketball team =

American college basketball season

1976–77 Michigan State Spartans men's basketball
- Conference: Big Ten Conference
- Record: 12–15 (9–9 Big Ten)
- Head coach: Jud Heathcote (1st season)
- Assistant coaches: Don Monson; Vernon Payne
- Captain: Robert Chapman
- Home arena: Jenison Fieldhouse

1976–77 Big Ten Conference men's basketball standings
	Conf.				Overall
Team	W		L	PCT	W		L	PCT
No. 1 Michigan	16	–	2	.889	26	–	4	.867
Purdue	14	–	4	.778	20	–	8	.714
Iowa	12	–	6	.667	20	–	7	.741
Indiana	11	–	7	.611	16	–	11	.593
Michigan State	9	–	9	.500	12	–	15	.444
Illinois	8	–	10	.444	16	–	14	.533
Wisconsin	7	–	11	.389	11	–	16	.407
Northwestern	7	–	11	.389	9	–	18	.333
Ohio State	6	–	12	.333	11	–	16	.407
No. 13 Minnesota*	0	–	18	.000	0	–	27	.000
Rankings from AP Poll; *Minnesota forfeited all games due to NCAA sanctions. Disputed record (15–3, 24–3)

The 1976–77 Michigan State Spartans men's basketball team represented Michigan State University in the 1976–77 NCAA Division I men's basketball season as members of the Big Ten Conference. They played their home games at Jenison Fieldhouse in East Lansing, Michigan and were coached by Jud Heathcote in his first year as head coach of the Spartans. MSU finished the season 10–17, 7–11 in Big Ten play to finish in fifth place.

Due to forfeits related to NCAA sanctions to Minnesota for improper selling of tickets, MSU's official record for the season is 12–15, 9–9.

== Previous season ==
The Spartans finished the 1975–76 season 14–13, 10–8 in Big Ten play to finish in fourth place. The season marked the last season for Gus Ganakas as Spartan head coach.

== Roster and statistics ==
1976–77 Michigan State Spartans men's basketball team
No	Name	Pos	Year	Height	Pts	Reb	Ast
12	Terry Donnelly	G	FR	6–2	7.9	1.9	
15	Ron Charles	F	FR	6–7	2.5	1.9	
21	Donald Flowers	G	JR	6–1	0.0	0.0	
22	Nate Phillips	G	JR	6–4	0.7	0.7	
23	Kevin Vandenbussche	G	SR	6–4	0.4	0.8	
24	Herbert Drayton	G	SR	6–4	0.3	0.3	
25	Alfred Brown	F	SO	6–6	1.3	1.6	
32	Greg Kelser	F	SO	6–5	21.7	10.8	
33	Edgar Wilson	F	SR	6–5	9.2	4.7	
34	Ricky Nash	F	JR	6–4	0.0	0.4	
41	Dan Riewald	F	SR	6–5	0.2	0.7	
42	Tanya Webb	C	SO	6–7	3.9	3.1	
44	Robert Chapman	G	SR	6–2	5.9	3.1	
45	James Coutre	C	JR	6–9	5.9	5.4	
52	Les DeYoung	C	JR	6–9			
	Mike Longaker	G	FR	6–1	0.2	0.0	

== Schedule and results ==
Date time, TV	Rank^{#}	Opponent^{#}	Result	Record	Site city, state
Non-conference regular season
Nov 29, 1976*		at Central Michigan	L 76–81	0–1	Rose Arena; Mount Pleasant, MI
Dec 4, 1976*		Western Michigan	L 73–74	0–2	Jenison Field House; East Lansing, MI
Dec 6, 1976*		No. 9 North Carolina	L 58–81	0–3	Jenison Field House; East Lansing, MI
Dec 11, 1976*		Eastern Michigan	W 54–52 ^{OT}	1–3	Jenison Field House; East Lansing, MI
Dec 15*		Detroit Mercy	L 94–99	1–4	Jenison Field House; East Lansing, MI
Dec 18, 1976*		at Canisius	W 82–59	2–4	Buffalo Memorial Auditorium; Buffalo, NY
Dec 18, 1976*		NC State	W 78–60	3–4	Jenison Field House; East Lansing, MI
Dec 29, 1976*		vs. Holy Cross; Gator Bowl Tournament semifinals	L 61–70	3–5	Swisher Gymnasium; Jacksonville, FL
Dec 30, 1976*		vs. Jacksonville; Gator Bowl Tournament third place game	L 63–65	3–6	Swisher Gymnasium; Jacksonville, FL
Big Ten regular season
Jan. 6, 1977		Wisconsin	W 84–61	4–6 (1–0)	Jenison Field House; East Lansing, MI
Jan 8, 1977		Northwestern	L 68–70	4–7 (1–1)	Jenison Field House; East Lansing, MI
Jan 15, 1977		No. 6 Michigan; Rivalry	L 70–83	4–8 (1–2)	Jenison Field House; East Lansing, MI
Jan 17, 1977		at Indiana	W 61–60	5–8 (2–2)	Assembly Hall; Bloomington, IN
Jan 20, 1977		Illinois	W 67–58	6–8 (3–2)	Jenison Field House; East Lansing, MI
Jan 22, 1977		No. 19 Purdue	L 70–76	6–9 (3–3)	Jenison Field House; East Lansing, MI
Jan 24, 1977		at No. 11 Minnesota	L 70–75	6–10 (3–4)	Williams Arena; Minneapolis, MN
Jan 27, 1977		at Northwestern	L 58–66	6–11 (3–5)	Welsh-Ryan Arena; Evanston, IL
Jan 29, 1977		at Wisconsin	L 83–87	6–12 (3–6)	Wisconsin Field House; Madison, WI
Feb 5, 1977		Indiana	L 79–81	6–13 (3–7)	Jenison Field House; East Lansing, MI
Feb 7, 1977		at Iowa	L 79–87	6–14 (3–8)	Iowa Field House; Iowa City, IA
Feb 12, 1977		at Ohio State	W 71–67	7–14 (4–8)	St. John Arena; Columbus, OH
Feb 17, 1977		No. 12 Minnesota	L 77–99	7–15 (4–9)	Jenison Field House; East Lansing, MI
Feb 19, 1977		Iowa	W 81–79	8–15 (5–9)	Jenison Field House; East Lansing, MI
Feb 26, 1977		at No. 3 Michigan; Rivalry	L 65–69	8–16 (5–10)	Crisler Arena; Ann Arbor, MI
Feb 28, 1977		Ohio State	W 80–79	9–16 (6–10)	Jenison Field House; East Lansing, MI
Mar 3, 1977		at Purdue	L 69–78	9–17 (6–11)	Mackey Arena; West Lafayette, IN
Mar 5, 1977		at Illinois	W 62–61	10–17 (7–11)	Assembly Hall; Champaign, IL
*Non-conference game. ^{#}Rankings from AP Poll. (#) Tournament seedings in parentheses. Source
