= 1976–77 Purdue Boilermakers men's basketball team =

American college basketball season

1976–77 Purdue Boilermakers men's basketball

ECAC Holiday Festival champions

NCAA Tournament, Round of 32
- Conference: Big Ten

Ranking
- Coaches: No. 20
- Record: 19–9 (13–5 Big Ten)
- Head coach: Fred Schaus (5th season)
- Assistant coaches: Joe Sexson (17th season); George Faerber (5th season); Roger Blalock (3rd season)
- Home arena: Mackey Arena

1976–77 Big Ten Conference men's basketball standings
| | Conf. | | | | Overall |
| Team | W | | L | PCT | W | | L | PCT |
|---|---|---|---|---|---|---|---|---|
| No. 1 Michigan | 16 | – | 2 | .889 | 26 | – | 4 | .867 |
| Purdue | 14 | – | 4 | .778 | 20 | – | 8 | .714 |
| Iowa | 12 | – | 6 | .667 | 20 | – | 7 | .741 |
| Indiana | 11 | – | 7 | .611 | 16 | – | 11 | .593 |
| Michigan State | 9 | – | 9 | .500 | 12 | – | 15 | .444 |
| Illinois | 8 | – | 10 | .444 | 16 | – | 14 | .533 |
| Wisconsin | 7 | – | 11 | .389 | 11 | – | 16 | .407 |
| Northwestern | 7 | – | 11 | .389 | 9 | – | 18 | .333 |
| Ohio State | 6 | – | 12 | .333 | 11 | – | 16 | .407 |
| No. 13 Minnesota* | 0 | – | 18 | .000 | 0 | – | 27 | .000 |
Rankings from AP Poll; *Minnesota forfeited all games due to NCAA sanctions. Disputed record (15–3, 24–3)

The 1976–77 Purdue Boilermakers men's basketball team represented Purdue University as a member of the Big Ten Conference during the 1976-77 college basketball season.

== Roster ==
1976–77 Purdue Boilermakers men's basketball team
Players
Coaches

| Pos. | # | Name | Height | Weight | Year | Hometown |
|---|---|---|---|---|---|---|
| C | 22 | Joe Barry Carroll | 7 ft 0 in (2.13 m) | 240 lb (109 kg) | Fr | Denver, Colorado |
| F | 34 | Walter Jordan | 6 ft 7 in (2.01 m) | 200 lb (91 kg) | Jr | Fort Wayne, Indiana |
| G | | Eugene Parker | 6 ft 2 in (1.88 m) | 175 lb (79 kg) | Jr | Fort Wayne, Indiana |
| G | | Bruce Parkinson | 6 ft 2 in (1.88 m) | 175 lb (79 kg) | Sr | Yorktown, Indiana |
| F | | Wayne Walls | 6 ft 7 in (2.01 m) | 190 lb (86 kg) | Jr | Jeffersonville, Indiana |
| C | | Tom Scheffler | 6 ft 11 in (2.11 m) | 220 lb (100 kg) | Sr | St. Joseph, Michigan |
| G | | Jerry Sichting | 6 ft 1 in (1.85 m) | 165 lb (75 kg) | So | Martinsville, Indiana |
| F | | Gerald Thomas | 6 ft 7 in (2.01 m) | 190 lb (86 kg) | Sr | Connersville, Indiana |
| C | | Bill Madey | 6 ft 7 in (2.01 m) | — | Fr |
| G | | Bill Smalley | 6 ft 0 in (1.83 m) | 160 lb (73 kg) | Sr | West Lafayette, Indiana |
| C | | Mike Kabat | 6 ft 9 in (2.06 m) | — | Fr |
| C | | Dan McDermott | 7 ft 0 in (2.13 m) | 240 lb (109 kg) | Jr | St. Louis, Missouri |
| F | | Michael Needham | 6 ft 8 in (2.03 m) | 220 lb (100 kg) | So | Mishawaka, Indiana |
| | | John Anthrop | 5 ft 11 in (1.8 m) | 165 lb (75 kg) | Fr | Lafayette, Indiana |

Head coach

- Fred Schaus

Assistant coach(es)

- Joe Sexson
- George Faerber
- Roger Blalock

Legend

- (C) Team captain
- (S) Suspended
- (I) Ineligible
- (W) Walk-on
- Injured
- Current redshirt

Roster
Last update: October 15, 2026

== Schedule and results ==
| Date time, TV | Rank^{#} | Opponent^{#} | Result | Record | Site city, state |
Non-conference Regular season
| Nov 26, 1976* | | at No. 13 Alabama | L 80–97 | 0–1 | Memorial Coliseum; Tuscaloosa, Alabama |
| Nov 29, 1976* | | at Miami (OH) | L 67–69 | 0–2 | Millett Hall; Oxford, Ohio |
| Dec 1, 1976* | | Butler | W 77–56 | 1–2 | Mackey Arena; West Lafayette, Indiana |
| Dec 4, 1976* | | at Providence | W 68–62 | 2–2 | Providence Civic Center; Providence, Rhode Island |
| Dec 7, 1976* | | Indiana State | W 82–68 | 3–2 | Mackey Arena; West Lafayette, Indiana |
| Dec 11, 1976* | | No. 14 Louisville | W 72–70 | 4–2 | Mackey Arena; West Lafayette, Indiana |
| Dec 22, 1976* | | No. 14 Arizona | L 76–85 | 4–3 | Mackey Arena; West Lafayette, Indiana |
| Dec 29, 1976* | | vs. Georgetown; ECAC Holiday Festival | W 83–65 | 5–3 | Madison Square Garden; New York, New York |
| Dec 30, 1976* | | at Manhattan; ECAC Holiday Festival | W 70–60 | 6–3 | Madison Square Garden; New York, New York |
Big Ten Regular season
| Jan 6, 1977 | | at Indiana; Rivalry | W 80–63 | 7–3 (1–0) | Assembly Hall; Bloomington, Indiana |
| Jan 8, 1977 | | at Ohio State | W 82–65 | 8–3 (2–0) | St. John Arena; Columbus, Ohio |
| Jan 13, 1977 | | Iowa | W 87–76 | 9–3 (3–0) | Mackey Arena; West Lafayette, Indiana |
| Jan 15, 1977 | | No. 9 Minnesota | W 66–64 | 10–3 (4–0) | Mackey Arena; West Lafayette, Indiana |
| Jan 20, 1977 | No. 19 | at No. 5 Michigan | L 76–82 | 10–4 (4–1) | Crisler Arena; Ann Arbor, Michigan |
| Jan 22, 1977 | No. 19 | at Michigan State | W 76–70 | 11–4 (5–1) | Jenison Field House; East Lansing, Michigan |
| Jan 24, 1977 | No. 18 | Wisconsin | W 81–71 | 12–4 (6–1) | Mackey Arena; West Lafayette, Indiana |
| Jan 29, 1977 | No. 18 | Illinois | W 66–63 | 13–4 (7–1) | Mackey Arena; West Lafayette, Indiana |
| Feb 3, 1977 | No. 18 | Northwestern | W 92–85 | 14–4 (8–1) | Mackey Arena; West Lafayette, Indiana |
| Feb 5, 1977 | No. 18 | at Illinois | L 70–71 | 14–5 (8–2) | Assembly Hall; Champaign, Illinois |
| Feb 10, 1977 | | at Wisconsin | L 74–76 | 14–6 (8–3) | Wisconsin Field House; Madison, Wisconsin |
| Feb 12, 1977 | | at Northwestern | W 102–84 | 15–6 (9–3) | McGaw Memorial Hall; Evanston, Illinois |
| Feb 17, 1977 | | Ohio State | W 90–61 | 16–6 (10–3) | Mackey Arena {{{site_cityst}}} |
| Feb 20, 1977 | | Indiana; Rivalry | W 86–78 | 17–6 (11–3) | Mackey Arena; West Lafayette, Indiana |
| Feb 24, 1977 | | at No. 13 Minnesota | L 78–84 | 17–7 (12–4) | Williams Arena; Minneapolis, Minnesota |
| Feb 26, 1977 | | at Iowa | W 81–70 | 18–7 (12–4) | Iowa Field House; Iowa City, Iowa |
| Mar 3, 1977 | | Michigan State | W 78–69 | 19–7 (13–4) | Mackey Arena; West Lafayette, Indiana |
| Mar 5, 1977 | | No. 3 Michigan | L 79–84 | 19–8 (13–5) | Mackey Arena; West Lafayette, Indiana |
NCAA tournament
| Mar 12, 1977* | | vs. No. 4 North Carolina | L 66–69 | 19–9 | Reynolds Coliseum; Raleigh, North Carolina |
*Non-conference game. ^{#}Rankings from AP poll. (#) Tournament seedings in parentheses. All times are in Eastern Time.

== Rankings ==
Ranking movements Legend: ██ Increase in ranking ██ Decrease in ranking — = Not ranked т = Tied with team above or below
| | Week | | | | | | | | | | | | | | | | | | | | |
| Poll | Pre | 1 | 2 | 3 | 4 | 5 | 6 | 7 | 8 | 9 | 10 | 11 | 12 | 13 | 14 | 15 | 16 | 17 | 18 | 19 | Final |
|---|---|---|---|---|---|---|---|---|---|---|---|---|---|---|---|---|---|---|---|---|---|
| AP | — | — | — | — | — | — | — | — | 19 | 18 | 18 | — | — | — | — | — | — | — | — | — | — |
| Coaches | 20 | — | — | 17 | — | — | 18т | 13 | 12 | 17 | 14 | — | — | — | — | — | — | — | — | — | 20 |
