= 1976–77 Michigan Wolverines men's basketball team =

American college basketball season

1976–77 Michigan Wolverines men's basketball

NCAA Division I regular season champions Big Ten regular season champions

NCAA tournament, Elite Eight
- Conference: Big Ten Conference

Ranking
- Coaches: No. 1
- AP: No. 1
- Record: 26–4 (16–2 Big Ten)
- Head coach: Johnny Orr
- Assistant coaches: Bill Frieder; Jim Boyce
- MVP: Phil Hubbard
- Captains: Steve Grote; John Robinson
- Home arena: Crisler Arena

1976–77 Big Ten Conference men's basketball standings
	Conf.				Overall
Team	W		L	PCT	W		L	PCT
No. 1 Michigan	16	–	2	.889	26	–	4	.867
Purdue	14	–	4	.778	20	–	8	.714
Iowa	12	–	6	.667	20	–	7	.741
Indiana	11	–	7	.611	16	–	11	.593
Michigan State	9	–	9	.500	12	–	15	.444
Illinois	8	–	10	.444	16	–	14	.533
Wisconsin	7	–	11	.389	11	–	16	.407
Northwestern	7	–	11	.389	9	–	18	.333
Ohio State	6	–	12	.333	11	–	16	.407
No. 13 Minnesota*	0	–	18	.000	0	–	27	.000
Rankings from AP Poll; *Minnesota forfeited all games due to NCAA sanctions. Disputed record (15–3, 24–3)

The 1976–77 Michigan Wolverines men's basketball team represented the University of Michigan in intercollegiate college basketball during the 1976–77 season. The team played its home games in the Crisler Arena in Ann Arbor, Michigan, and was a member of the Big Ten Conference. Under the direction of head coach Johnny Orr, the team won the Big Ten Conference Championship.

== Season review ==
The team earned the last of four consecutive NCAA Division I men's basketball tournament invitations. Steve Grote and John Robinson served as team captains, while Phil Hubbard earned team MVP. As a team, they led the conference in scoring offense with an 83.2 average in conference games as well as scoring margin with a 9.4 average. The team began and ended the season ranked number one in the Associated Press Top Twenty Poll and was ranked all seventeen weeks, including eight at number one. The team also ended the season ranked atop the final UPI Coaches' Poll.

On December 29, 1976, Hubbard became the first Wolverine to play 50 minutes in a game against Providence. In 1980, Mike McGee would play 54 minutes in a game. The team's 21 for 22 performance on February 17 against Indiana was the school free throw percentage record until February 21, 1987. The team totaled 17 steals on February 26, 1977, as both Rickey Green and Hubbard had 6 against Michigan State, which lasted as a school record until December 3, 1994. Green had 7 steals on November 27, 1976, against Western Kentucky, which remains unsurpassed in school history.

== Schedule ==
1976-77 Overall: 26-4 Big Ten: 16-2 (1st | Champions) Postseason: NCAA (Mideast) (Elite Eight) Head Coach: Johnny Orr Staff: Bill Frieder & Jim Boyce Captains: Steve Grote & John Robinson Home Arena: Crisler Arena (13,609)

Date Rk Opponent H/A W/L Score +/-
11/27/1976 #1 Western Kentucky H W 94-70 +24
12/4/1976 #1 Fordham H W 78-57 +21
12/6/1976 #1 at Vanderbilt A W 97-76 +21
12/18/1976 #1 Kent State H W 102-66 +36
12/21/1976 #1 Central Michigan H W 104-63 +41
12/28/1976 #1 vs. Rhode Island N1 W 95-85 +10
12/29/1976 #1 vs. Providence (2OT) N1 L 81-82 -1
1/2/1977 #1 at South Carolina A W 90-86 +4
1/6/1977 #5 Northwestern+ H W 102-65 +37
1/8/1977 #5 Wisconsin+ H W 66-63 +3
1/15/1977 #6 at Michigan State+ A W 83-70 +13
1/17/1977 #6 at Iowa+ A W 99-75 +24
1/20/1977 #5 #19 Purdue+ H W 82-76 +6
1/22/1977 #5 Illinois+ H W 66-61 +5
1/24/1977 #5 at Ohio State+ A W 92-81 +11
1/27/1977 #2 at Wisconsin+ A W 69-64 +5
1/29/1977 #2 at Northwestern+ A L 87-99 -12
2/3/1977 #7 Indiana+ H W 89-84 +5
2/5/1977 #7 Ohio State+ H W 93-72 +21
2/7/1977 #7 at #10 Minnesota+ A W 86-80 +6
2/13/1977 #5 at Indiana+ A L 64-73 -9
2/17/1977 #5 Iowa+ H W 91-80 +11
2/19/1977 #5 #12 Minnesota+ H W 89-70 +19
2/26/1977 #3 Michigan State+ (OT) H W 69-65 +4
3/3/1977 #3 at Illinois+ A W 87-72 +15
3/5/1977 #3 at Purdue+ A W 84-79 +5
3/6/1977 #3 #19 Marquette H W 69-68 +1
3/13/1977 #1 vs. Holy Cross N2 W 92-81 +11
3/17/1977 #1 vs. #12 Detroit N3 W 86-81 +5
3/19/1977 #1 vs. #17 UNC-Charlotte N3 L 68-75 -7

(1) Providence National Classic, Providence, R.I. (Providence Civic Center) (2) NCAA Tournament, Bloomington, Ind. (Assembly Hall) (3) NCAA Tournament, Lexington, Ky. (Rupp Arena)

== Postseason ==
In the 32-team 1977 NCAA Division I men's basketball tournament, Michigan reached the elite eight in the Mideast region by defeating the Holy Cross Crusaders 92–81 and the Detroit Titans 86–81. The team then fell to the Charlotte 49ers 75–68. In the game against the Detroit Titans on March 17, Hubbard totaled 26 rebounds, which is an NCAA Division I men's basketball tournament single-game record (since 1973).

=== NCAA tournament summary ===
- Mideast
  - Michigan 92, Holy Cross 81
  - Michigan 86, Detroit 81
  - Charlotte 75, Michigan 68

== Roster ==
- David Baxter
- Tom Bergen
- Thomas Bergen
- Steve Grote (C)
- Rickey Green
- Alan Hardy
- Phil Hubbard
- Robert Jones
- William Lelich
- Len Lillard
- Mark Lozier
- John Robinson (C)
- Thomas Staton
- David Stavale
- Joel Thompson
- Head coach: Johnny Orr
- Assistants: Jim Boyce, Dan Fife, Bill Frieder

== Accomplishments ==
The team was led by Consensus second team All-Americans Rickey Green and Phil Hubbard. That season, Hubbard set the current school single-season total rebound record of 389, surpassing M. C. Burton, Jr.'s 1959 total of 379. He also surpassed Bill Buntin's 1963 single-season total of 23 point-rebound double doubles with 24. Grote's career assist total of 358 would stand as a school record for 7 seasons until eclipsed by Eric Turner, while Rickey Green's career assist average of 4.05 per game would also be a record until eclipsed by Turner. For the season Green totaled 61 steals for a 2.18 average, which stood as school records until Gary Grant totaled 84 and averaged 2.55 in 1986. Grote's 116 career games played lasted as a Michigan record until 1986 when Richard Rellford totaled 124, while his 108 career starts stood as a record until Mike McGee totaled 112 in 1981. The team set the school single-season free throws made record of 510, which surpassed the 1965 mark of 494 and would last until 1989. The team set the school single-season total steals record of 263 that stood until 1986. Green ended his career with an average of 32.7 minutes per game, which was a school record tied by Phil Hubbard two years later and surpassed by Mike McGee.

=== Statistics ===
The team posted the following statistics:

Name	GP	GS	Min	Avg	FG	FGA	FG%	3FG	3FGA	3FG%	FT	FTA	FT%	OR	DR	RB	Avg	Ast	Avg	PF	DQ	TO	Stl	Blk	Pts	Avg
Phil Hubbard	30	30			228	410	0.556	--	--		132	195	0.677	0	389	389	13.0	44	1.5	109	4	83			588	19.6
Rickey Green	28	27			224	464	0.483	--	--		98	128	0.766	0	81	81	2.9	120	4.3	59	3	66			546	19.5
John Robinson	30	29			124	246	0.504	--	--		78	104	0.750	2	154	156	5.2	40	1.3	68	1	73			326	10.9
Steve Grote	30	30			118	262	0.450	--	--		65	90	0.722	1	88	89	3.0	99	3.3	95	3	83			301	10.0
Dave Baxter	29	3			94	186	0.505	--	--		41	57	0.719	0	46	46	1.6	63	2.2	54	2	54			229	7.9
Joel Thompson	30	11			87	164	0.530	--	--		36	51	0.706	1	103	104	3.5	23	0.8	63	2	26			210	7.0
Tom Staton	30	20			75	173	0.434	--	--		31	47	0.660	4	89	93	3.1	76	2.5	83	4	53			181	6.0
Alan Hardy	29	0			47	104	0.452	--	--		15	25	0.600	0	65	65	2.2	8	0.3	32	0	27			109	3.8
Tom Bergen	23	0			12	30	0.400	--	--		7	14	0.500	0	35	35	1.5	5	0.2	27	0	9			31	1.4
Len Lillard	11	0			8	12	0.667	--	--		2	2	1.000	1	10	11	1.0	0	0.0	3	0	3			18	1.6
Mark Lozier	17	0			5	16	0.313	--	--		4	5	0.800	0	13	13	0.8	5	0.3	9	0	7			14	0.8
Bobby Jones	9	0			0	8	0.000	--	--		1	4	0.250	0	6	6	0.7	0	0.0	2	0	1			1	0.1
Dave Stavale	1	0	2	2.0	0	0		--	--		0	0		0	0	0	0.0	0	0.0	0	0	1	0	0	0	0.0
Bill Lelich	1	0	2	2.0	0	1	0.000	--	--		0	0		0	7	7	7.0	0	0.0	0	0	0	0	0	0	0.0
TEAM	30														96	96	3.2									
Season Total	30				1022	2076	0.492				510	722	0.706	9	1182	1191	39.7	483	16.1	604	19	486			2554	85.1
Opponents	30				921	1899	0.485	--	--		377	543	0.694	7	1086	1093	36.4	429	14.3	642	43	605			2219	74.0

== Rankings ==
Ranking movements Legend: ██ Increase in ranking ██ Decrease in ranking
	Week																
Poll	Pre	1	2	3	4	5	6	7	8	9	10	11	12	13	14	15	Final
AP Poll	1	1	1	1	1	1	5	6	5	2	7	5	5	3	3	1	1

== Team players drafted into the NBA ==
Six players from this team were selected in the NBA draft.

Year	Round	Pick	Overall	Player	NBA Club
1977	1	16	16	Rickey Green	Golden State Warriors
1977	3	11	55	Steve Grote	Cleveland Cavaliers
1977	5	22	110	John Robinson	Los Angeles Lakers
1978	3	17	61	Dave Baxter	Seattle SuperSonics
1978	4	3	69	Joel Thompson	Houston Rockets
1979	1	15	15	Phil Hubbard	Detroit Pistons

== See also ==
- NCAA Men's Division I Tournament bids by school
- NCAA Men's Division I Tournament bids by school and conference
- NCAA Division I men's basketball tournament all-time team records
