= Eugene Parker (sports agent) =

American sports agent and college basketball player

Personal information
- Born: February 24, 1956 Fort Wayne, Indiana
- Died: March 31, 2016 (aged 60) Fort Wayne, Indiana
- Listed height: 6 ft 1 in (1.85 m)
- Listed weight: 175 lb (79 kg)

Career information
- High school: Concordia Lutheran (Fort Wayne, Indiana)
- College: Purdue (1974–1978)
- NBA draft: 1978: 5th round, 108th overall pick
- Drafted by: San Antonio Spurs
- Position: Guard

Career highlights
- Second-team All-Big Ten – Media (1976); Third-team All-Big Ten – Coaches (1976)
- Stats at Basketball Reference

Eugene E. Parker (February 24, 1956 – March 31, 2016) was an American sports agent, known for representing Deion Sanders, Emmitt Smith, and many other NFL athletes. Parker was named by Black Enterprise Magazine as one of the top 50 influential black people in sports, and was ranked 45th in the Sports Illustrated list of the top 101 most influential minorities in sports. For many, Parker was known to be the first African-American lawyer to pioneer into sports representation and went on to become one of the great American sports agents. Parker, known for his integrity, is the only sports agent with an official road named in his memorial.

== Biography ==
Born and raised in Fort Wayne, Indiana, Parker graduated from Purdue University in 1978, and graduated from Valparaiso University School of Law in 1982. In his early years, after receiving his law degree, Parker trained his former NFL client Roosevelt Barnes to be his long-time partner in the agent business and groomed another agent Craig McKenzie a fellow graduate of Valparaiso University School of Law. Parker, at his company Maximum Sports Management, oversaw 5 agents in his practice.

When Parker was an undergrad student at Purdue University he studied Business Management. He was also a four-year starter on the Purdue men's basketball team where he scored 1,430 career points (currently #21 on the career list). He was a team captain for two years where he earned all Big Ten awards, and the John Wooden Award as the Boilermakers' Most Valuable Player. After his college career, Parker was drafted in the late rounds of the NBA draft by the San Antonio Spurs. He turned down the NBA ranks to take a graduate assist coaching job at Valparaiso University while he earned a law degree. Following his collegiate career, Parker was selected for the 1978 US National Team while as a member of Athletes in Action; the US Team finished the competition with a record of 3–4, good for 5th place.

Parker then went on to found his company, Parker & Associates later re-branded as Maximum Sports Management. His early signings included NFL All-Pro defensive players Rod Woodson and Deion Sanders. In 1995, Parker negotiated Deion Sanders' lucrative seven year, $35 million contract, with a $13 million signing bonus, which at time was highest signing bonus in history and made Sanders the highest paid defensive player in the NFL at that time.

In 2004, he negotiated a six-year deal worth $60 million for wide receiver Larry Fitzgerald, making Larry the highest paid rookie in the NFL ever. Many of Parker's rookie clients have been holdouts in the NFL. Most recently, the 2nd overall pick in the 2010 NFL draft, Ndamukong Suh held out for 4 days before signing a 5-year deal worth a possible $68 Million with $40 Million guaranteed. Holdouts are nothing new, but this holdout was under more scrutiny due to the nature of the high pick. The prior season in 2009, San Francisco WR, Michael Crabtree, also held out for a third of his rookie season. Parker contended that Crabtree deserved more money than where he ended up being drafted. On August 6, 2011, Parker became one of only four sports agents to ever present a player into the National Football Hall of Fame when he presented his long-time client and friend Deion Sanders into the 2011 Pro Football Hall of Fame.

== Clients ==
Some of Parker's clients included:

- Deion Sanders
- Hines Ward
- Richard Seymour
- Walter Jones
- Emmitt Smith
- Larry Fitzgerald
- Derrick Brooks
- Rod Woodson
- Aeneas Williams
- Devin Hester
- Cedric Benson
- Curtis Martin
- Laveranues Coles
- Jason Peters
- Ahmed Plummer
- Greg Jennings
- Felix Jones
- Steven Jackson
- Tyson Jackson
- Michael Crabtree
- Ndamukong Suh
- Jairus Byrd
- David Terrell
- Dez Bryant
- Quincy Carter
- Sammy Watkins
- Alshon Jeffery
- Carlos Hyde
