= 1976–77 Indiana Hoosiers men's basketball team =

American college basketball season

1976–77 Indiana Hoosiers men's basketball
- Conference: Big Ten Conference
- Record: 16–11 (11–7 Big Ten)
- Head coach: Bobby Knight (6th season)
- Assistant coach: Bob Donewald
- Captain: Kent Benson
- Home arena: Assembly Hall

1976–77 Big Ten Conference men's basketball standings
	Conf.				Overall
Team	W		L	PCT	W		L	PCT
No. 1 Michigan	16	–	2	.889	26	–	4	.867
Purdue	14	–	4	.778	20	–	8	.714
Iowa	12	–	6	.667	20	–	7	.741
Indiana	11	–	7	.611	16	–	11	.593
Michigan State	9	–	9	.500	12	–	15	.444
Illinois	8	–	10	.444	16	–	14	.533
Wisconsin	7	–	11	.389	11	–	16	.407
Northwestern	7	–	11	.389	9	–	18	.333
Ohio State	6	–	12	.333	11	–	16	.407
No. 13 Minnesota*	0	–	18	.000	0	–	27	.000
Rankings from AP Poll; *Minnesota forfeited all games due to NCAA sanctions. Disputed record (15–3, 24–3)

The 1976–77 Indiana Hoosiers men's basketball team represented Indiana University. Their head coach was Bobby Knight, who was in his 6th year. The team played its home games in Assembly Hall in Bloomington, Indiana, and was a member of the Big Ten Conference.

Coming off an undefeated season (32–0), the Hoosiers faced a disappointing season by completing the regular season with an overall record of 16–11 and a conference record of 11–7, finishing 4th in the Big Ten Conference. After winning their third national title in the previous season, Indiana did not participate in any postseason tournament.

== Roster ==
No.	Name	Position	Ht.	Year	Hometown
20	Bill Cunningham	G	6–4	Fr.	Phoenix, Illinois
22	Wayne Radford	G/F	6–3	Jr.	Indianapolis, Indiana
23	Jim Wisman	G	6–2	Jr.	Quincy, Illinois
31	Scott Eells	F	6–9	So.	Hoopeston, Illinois
33	Trent Smock	G/F	6–5	Sr.	Richmond, Indiana
34	Rich Valavicius	F	6–5	So.	Hammond, Indiana
40	Glen Grunwald	F	6–9	Fr.	Franklin Park, Illinois
41	Butch Carter	G/F	6–5	Fr.	Middletown, Ohio
42	Mike Woodson	F	6–5	Fr.	Indianapolis, Indiana
43	Jim Roberson	C	6–9	So.	Rochester, New York
44	Derek Holcomb	C	6–11	Fr.	Peoria, Illinois
45	Mike Miday	F	6–8	Fr.	Canton, Ohio
54	Kent Benson	C	6–11	Sr.	New Castle, Indiana

== Schedule/results ==
Date time, TV	Rank^{#}	Opponent^{#}	Result	Record	Site city, state
Regular season
11/27/1976*	No. 5	South Dakota	W 110–64	1–0	Assembly Hall; Bloomington, IN
12/1/1976*	No. 4	at Toledo	L 57–59	1–1	Centennial Hall; Toledo, OH
12/6/1976*	No. 4	No. 5 Kentucky; Indiana–Kentucky rivalry	L 51–66	1–2	Assembly Hall; Bloomington, IN
12/14/1976*	No. 16	at No. 4 Notre Dame	L 65–78	1–3	Joyce Center; Notre Dame, IN
12/17/1976*	No. 16	vs. DePaul	W 50–42	2–3	Market Square Arena; Indianapolis, IN
12/20/1976*	No. 16	Utah State; Indiana Classic	W 79–71	3–3	Assembly Hall; Bloomington, IN
12/21/1976*		Miami (OH); Indiana Classic	W 76–55	4–3	Assembly Hall; Bloomington, IN
12/29/1976*		vs. Georgia; Sugar Bowl Classic First Round	W 74–52	5–3	Louisiana Superdome; New Orleans, LA
12/30/1976*		vs. No. 5 Cincinnati; Sugar Bowl Classic Championship	L 43–52	5–4	Louisiana Superdome; New Orleans, LA
1/6/1977		Purdue; Rivalry	L 63–80	5–5 (0–1)	Assembly Hall; Bloomington, IN
1/8/1977		Illinois; Rivalry	W 80–60	6–5 (1–1)	Assembly Hall; Bloomington, IN
1/13/1977		at Northwestern	W 78–53	7–5 (2–1)	Welsh-Ryan Arena; Evanston, IL
1/15/1977		at Wisconsin	W 79–64	8–5 (3–1)	Wisconsin Field House; Madison, WI
1/17/1977		Michigan State	L 60–61	8–6 (3–2)	Assembly Hall; Bloomington, IN
1/22/1977		at Ohio State	W 79–56	9–6 (4–2)	St. John Arena; Columbus, OH
1/27/1977		No. 13 Minnesota	L 60–79^	10–6 (5–2)	Assembly Hall; Bloomington, IN
1/29/1977		Iowa	W 81–65	11–6 (6–2)	Assembly Hall; Bloomington, IN
2/3/1977		at No. 7 Michigan	L 84–89	11–7 (6–3)	Crisler Arena; Ann Arbor, MI
2/5/1977		at Michigan State	W 81–79	12–7 (7–3)	Jenison Fieldhouse; East Lansing, MI
2/13/1977		No. 5 Michigan	W 73–64	13–7 (8–3)	Assembly Hall; Bloomington, IN
2/15/1977		at No. 12 Minnesota	L 61–65^	14–7 (9–3)	Williams Arena; Minneapolis, MN
2/17/1977		at Illinois; Rivalry	L 69–73	14–8 (9–4)	Assembly Hall; Champaign, IL
2/20/1977		at Purdue; Rivalry	L 78–86	14–9 (9–5)	Mackey Arena; West Lafayette, IN
2/24/1977		Wisconsin	L 64–66	14–10 (9–6)	Assembly Hall; Bloomington, IN
2/26/1977		Northwestern	W 69–54	15–10 (10–6)	Assembly Hall; Bloomington, IN
2/28/1977		at Iowa	L 73–80	15–11 (10–7)	Iowa Field House; Iowa City, IA
3/5/1977		Ohio State	W 75–69	16–11 (11–7)	Assembly Hall; Bloomington, IN
*Non-conference game. ^{#}Rankings from AP Poll. (#) Tournament seedings in parentheses.

== Notes ==
^Jan 27/Feb 15: Minnesota forfeited these games, thus IU's official record is 16–11 (11–7).
