= 1976–77 Illinois Fighting Illini men's basketball team =

American college basketball season

1976–77 Illinois Fighting Illini men's basketball
- Conference: Big Ten Conference
- Record: 16–14 (8–10 Big Ten)
- Head coach: Lou Henson (2nd season)
- Assistant coaches: Tony Yates (3rd season); Bill Molinari (1st season); Les Wothke (2nd season)
- MVP: Audie Matthews
- Captain: Audie Matthews
- Home arena: Assembly Hall

1976–77 Big Ten Conference men's basketball standings
	Conf.				Overall
Team	W		L	PCT	W		L	PCT
No. 1 Michigan	16	–	2	.889	26	–	4	.867
Purdue	14	–	4	.778	20	–	8	.714
Iowa	12	–	6	.667	20	–	7	.741
Indiana	11	–	7	.611	16	–	11	.593
Michigan State	9	–	9	.500	12	–	15	.444
Illinois	8	–	10	.444	16	–	14	.533
Wisconsin	7	–	11	.389	11	–	16	.407
Northwestern	7	–	11	.389	9	–	18	.333
Ohio State	6	–	12	.333	11	–	16	.407
No. 13 Minnesota*	0	–	18	.000	0	–	27	.000
Rankings from AP Poll; *Minnesota forfeited all games due to NCAA sanctions. Disputed record (15–3, 24–3)

The 1976–77 Illinois Fighting Illini men's basketball team represented the University of Illinois.

== Regular season ==
The 1976–77 team would include Lou Henson's first group of recruited athletes. Levi Cobb, Neil Bresnahan, and Steve Lanter contributed to a quick start on the season and a 7–1 record. The team's only loss was by 1 point at the hands of Missouri in the Show Me Classic played in Columbia, MO. Before the Big Ten season commenced the Illini had staked themselves to an 8–4 record, yet the fans support still did not yet believe in Henson's squad.

A mere 6,938 fans attended a mid-December Saturday afternoon game versus Arizona State. Even with fewer fans coming out, the team set a series of offensive records in the Big Ten opener against Ohio State. The records included converting on 19 of their first 21 shots and shooting 69.4 percent for the game.

During the course of the season the Illini would lose twice to the Golden Gophers, however, before the NCAA Tournament it was determined that Minnesota had committed violations that resulted in sanctions against them, including the forfeiture of all of their games. This gave the Illini two additional wins and a final record of 16–14, with an 8–10 conference mark.

The team's starting lineup included Rick Leighty, Ken Ferdinand and Levi Cobb as forwards, Audie Matthews and Steve Lanter at the guard positions, and Rich Adams playing center.

=== Roster ===
1976–77 Illinois Fighting Illini men's basketball team
Players
Coaches

Pos.	#	Name	Height	Weight	Year	Previous school	Hometown
G	10	Rick Kirby	6 ft 1 in (1.85 m)	175 lb (79 kg)	Fr	Urbana High School	Urbana, Illinois
F	12	Ken Ferdinand	6 ft 6 in (1.98 m)	200 lb (91 kg)	So	Urbana High School	Urbana, Illinois
G	20	Jeff Berry	6 ft 2 in (1.88 m)	175 lb (79 kg)	Fr	Morgan Park High School	Chicago, Illinois
G	21	Steve Lanter	6 ft 4 in (1.93 m)	175 lb (79 kg)	RS Fr	Mascoutah Community High School	Belleville, Illinois
G	23	Larry Lubin	6 ft 0 in (1.83 m)	175 lb (79 kg)	So	New Trier High School	Glencoe, Illinois
F	24	Tom Gerhardt	6 ft 6 in (1.98 m)	210 lb (95 kg)	Jr	De La Salle High School	Chicago, Illinois
G	30	Rob Judson	6 ft 2 in (1.88 m)	170 lb (77 kg)	Fr	Zion-Benton High School	Zion, Illinois
F	31	Neil Bresnahan	6 ft 6 in (1.98 m)	195 lb (88 kg)	Fr	Fenwick High School	Oak Park, Illinois
F	32	Levi Cobb	6 ft 6 in (1.98 m)	205 lb (93 kg)	Fr	Morgan Park High School	Chicago, Illinois
G/F	34	Rick Leighty	6 ft 4 in (1.93 m)	180 lb (82 kg)	Jr	Lawrenceville High School	Lawrenceville, Illinois
F	40	Rich Adams	6 ft 8 in (2.03 m)	200 lb (91 kg)	Jr	Colerain High School	Cincinnati, Ohio
G/F	42	Tim Bushell	6 ft 6 in (1.98 m)	195 lb (88 kg)	Sr	Lincoln Community High School	Lincoln, Illinois
G/F	44	Audie Matthews (C)	6 ft 5 in (1.96 m)	185 lb (84 kg)	Jr	Bloom High School	Chicago Heights, Illinois
G	50	Jeff Carter	6 ft 4 in (1.93 m)	175 lb (79 kg)	Fr	St. Ignatius High School	Chicago, Illinois
G	52	Matt Meyer	6 ft 0 in (1.83 m)	165 lb (75 kg)	So	Forman High School	Manito, Illinois

Head coach

- Lou Henson (New Mexico State University) (2nd year)

Assistant coach(es)

- Tony Yates (University of Cincinnati) (3rd year)
- Les Wothke (Greenville University) (2nd year)
- Bill Molinari (Illinois Wesleyan University) (1st year)

Legend

- (C) Team captain
- (S) Suspended
- (I) Ineligible
- (W) Walk-on
- Injured
- Current redshirt

Roster

== Schedule ==
Date time, TV	Rank^{#}	Opponent^{#}	Result	Record	Site (attendance) city, state
Non-Conference regular season
11/26/1976*		at St. Louis	W 68–65	1–0	Kiel Auditorium (9,148); St. Louis, MO
12/3/1976*		at Missouri; Show Me Classic	L 75–76	1–1	Hearnes Center (5,227); Columbia, MO
12/4/1976*		St. Louis; Show-Me Classic	W 54–46	2–1	Hearnes Center (5,227); Columbia, MO
12/8/1976*		San Jose State	W 84–70	3–1	Assembly Hall (6,113); Champaign, IL
12/11/1976*		Nebraska	W 67–63	4–1	Assembly Hall (7,055); Champaign, IL
12/13/1976*		Cleveland State; Illini Classic	W 72–70	5–1	Assembly Hall (5,389); Champaign, IL
12/17/1976*		Cal Poly; Illini Classic	W 67–65	6–1	Assembly Hall (5,489); Champaign, IL
12/18/1976*		Arizona State	W 80–74	7–1	Assembly Hall (6,938); Champaign, IL
12/27/1976*		Houston; Rainbow Classic	L 66–69	7–2	Neal S. Blaisdell Center (–); Honolulu, HI
12/29/1976*		William & Mary; Rainbow Classic	W 73–64	8–2	Neal S. Blaisdell Center (–); Honolulu, HI
12/30/1976*		St. John's; Rainbow Classic	L 52–56	8–3	Neal S. Blaisdell Center (1,849); Honolulu, HI
1/1/1977*		at Long Beach State	W 81–71	8–4	Gold Mine (4,030); Long Beach, CA
Big Ten regular season
1/6/1977		at Ohio State	W 89–72	9–4 (1–0)	St. John's Arena (6,907); Columbus, OH
1/8/1977		at Indiana; Rivalry	L 60–80	9–5 (1–1)	Assembly Hall (16,497); Bloomington, IN
1/13/1977		No. 9 Minnesota	L 69–83	10–5 (2–1)	Assembly Hall (7,689); Champaign, IL
1/15/1977		Iowa; Rivalry	L 81–84 ^{ot}	10–6 (2–2)	Assembly Hall (7,246); Champaign, IL
1/20/1977		at Michigan State	L 58–67	10–7 (2–3)	Jenison Fieldhouse (3,417); East Lansing, MI
1/22/1977		at No. 5 Michigan	L 61–66	10–8 (2–4)	Crisler Arena (13,609); Ann Arbor, MI
1/24/1977		Northwestern; Rivalry	W 71–68	11–8 (3–4)	Assembly Hall (5,810); Champaign, IL
1/29/1977		at No. 18 Purdue	L 63–66	11–9 (3–5)	Mackey Arena (12,800); West Lafayette, IN
2/3/1977		Wisconsin	W 82–72	12–9 (4–5)	Assembly Hall (6,144); Champaign, IL
2/5/1977		No. 18 Purdue	W 71–70	13–9 (5–5)	Assembly Hall (9,700); Champaign, IL
2/10/1977		at Northwestern; Rivalry	W 65–63	14–9 (6–5)	McGaw Memorial Hall (3,966); Evanston, IL
2/12/1977		at Wisconsin	L 50–62	13–8 (6–6)	Wisconsin Field House (7,589); Madison, WI
2/17/1977		Indiana; Rivalry	W 73–69	14–8 (7–6)	Assembly Hall (11,172); Champaign, IL
2/19/1977		Ohio State	L 60–64	14–9 (7–7)	Assembly Hall (8,849); Champaign, IL
2/24/1977		at Iowa; Rivalry	L 64–76	14–10 (7–8)	Iowa Field House (9,875); Iowa City, IA
2/26/1977		at No. 13 Minnesota	L 70–72	15–10 (8–8)	Williams Arena (15,163); Minneapolis, MN
3/3/1977		No. 3 Michigan	L 72–87	15–11 (8–9)	Assembly Hall (10,524); Champaign, IL
3/5/1977		Michigan State	L 61–62	15–12 (8–10)	Assembly Hall (8,021); Champaign, IL
*Non-conference game. ^{#}Rankings from AP Poll. (#) Tournament seedings in parentheses. All times are in Central Time.

== Player stats ==
Player	Games played	Minutes played	Field goals	Free throws	Rebounds	Assists	Points
Audie Matthews	30	1023	202	75	151	75	479
Rich Adams	30	846	171	45	171	62	387
Levi Cobb	30	942	126	54	192	57	306
Ken Ferdinand	28	521	109	43	108	27	261
Neil Bresnahan	28	684	80	46	138	31	206
Steve Lanter	30	966	76	39	49	103	191
Rick Leighty	26	408	45	11	72	37	101
Rob Judson	14	162	20	14	5	19	54
Larry Lubin	25	185	14	3	23	27	31
Tom Gerhardt	23	184	6	4	34	14	16
Rick Kirby	17	102	6	4	2	7	16
Jeff Berry	3	2	0	0	0	0	0
Tim Bushell	1	1	0	0	0	0	0
Jeff Carter	2	2	0	0	0	0	0
Matt Meyer	2	2	0	0	0	0	0

== Awards and honors ==
- Audie Matthews
  - Team Most Valuable Player

== Team players drafted into the NBA ==
Player	NBA Club	Round	Pick
