= 1976–77 Iowa Hawkeyes men's basketball team =

American college basketball season

1976–77 Iowa Hawkeyes men's basketball
- Conference: Big Ten Conference
- Record: 20–7 (12–6 Big Ten)
- Head coach: Lute Olson (3rd season)
- Assistant coach: Jim Rosborough
- MVP: Bruce King
- Home arena: Iowa Field House (Capacity: 13,365)

1976–77 Big Ten Conference men's basketball standings
	Conf.				Overall
Team	W		L	PCT	W		L	PCT
No. 1 Michigan	16	–	2	.889	26	–	4	.867
Purdue	14	–	4	.778	20	–	8	.714
Iowa	12	–	6	.667	20	–	7	.741
Indiana	11	–	7	.611	16	–	11	.593
Michigan State	9	–	9	.500	12	–	15	.444
Illinois	8	–	10	.444	16	–	14	.533
Wisconsin	7	–	11	.389	11	–	16	.407
Northwestern	7	–	11	.389	9	–	18	.333
Ohio State	6	–	12	.333	11	–	16	.407
No. 13 Minnesota*	0	–	18	.000	0	–	27	.000
Rankings from AP Poll; *Minnesota forfeited all games due to NCAA sanctions. Disputed record (15–3, 24–3)

The 1976–77 Iowa Hawkeyes men's basketball team represented the University of Iowa as members of the Big Ten Conference. The team was led by head coach Lute Olson, coaching in his 3rd season at the school, and played their home games at the Iowa Field House. They finished the season 18–9 overall and 10–8 in Big Ten play (later changed to 20–7, 12–6).

== Roster ==
1976–77 Iowa Hawkeyes men's basketball team
Players
Coaches

Pos.	#	Name	Height	Weight	Year	Hometown
G	10	Cal Wulfsberg	6 ft 3 in (1.91 m)	—	Sr
G	12	Ronnie Lester	6 ft 2 in (1.88 m)	—	Fr	Chicago, Illinois
G	20	Dick Peth	6 ft 2 in (1.88 m)	—	So	Tomah, Wisconsin
G	23	Kirk Speraw	6 ft 0 in (1.83 m)	—	So	Sioux City, Iowa
F	24	William Mayfield	6 ft 7 in (2.01 m)	205 lb (93 kg)	So	Detroit, Michigan
F	40	Terry Drake	6 ft 7 in (2.01 m)	—	Jr	Elgin, Illinois
F	44	Clay Hargrave	6 ft 4 in (1.93 m)	—	So	Iowa City, Iowa
F/C	54	Bruce "Sky" King	6 ft 8 in (2.03 m)	—	Sr	Dayton, Ohio

Head coach

Lute Olson

Assistant coach(es)

- Jim Rosborough

Legend

- (C) Team captain
- (S) Suspended
- (I) Ineligible
- (W) Walk-on
- Injured
- Current redshirt

== Schedule/results ==
Date time, TV	Rank^{#}	Opponent^{#}	Result	Record	Site city, state
Non-conference regular season
11/27/1976*		at Nebraska; Rivalry	W 71-57	1-0	Bob Devaney Sports Center; Lincoln, NE
11/29/1976*		Kent State	W 84-55	2-0	Iowa Field House; Iowa City, IA
12/4/1976*		at Drake	W 86-71	3-0	Veteran's Memorial Auditorium (12,000); Des Moines, IA
12/6/1976*		Bradley	W 90-77	4-0	Iowa Field House; Iowa City, IA
12/10/1976*		California	W 94-73	5-0	Iowa Field House; Iowa City, IA
12/18/1976*		Iowa State; Rivalry	W 85-64	6-0	Iowa Field House; Iowa City, IA
12/21/1976*		Drake	W 82-69	7-0	Iowa Field House; Iowa City, IA
12/29/1976*		at New Mexico	L 83-96	7-1	The Pit; Albuquerque, NM
12/30/1976*		vs. Pittsburgh	W 103-80	8-1	
Big Ten Conference Season
1/8/1977		at No. 13 Minnesota	L 68-78	8-2 (0-1)	Williams Arena; Minneapolis, MN
1/13/1977		at Purdue	L 76-87	8-3 (0-2)	Mackey Arena; West Lafayette, IN
1/15/1977		at Illinois	W 84-81 ^{OT}	9-3 (1-2)	Assembly Hall; Champaign, IL
1/17/1977		No. 6 Michigan	L 75-99	9-4 (1-3)	Iowa Field House; Iowa City, IA
1/22/1977		Northwestern	W 76-74	10-4 (2-3)	Iowa Field House; Iowa City, IA
1/27/1977		Ohio State	W 84-66	11-4 (3-3)	Iowa Field House; Iowa City, IA
1/29/1977		at Indiana	L 65-81	11-5 (3-4)	Assembly Hall; Bloomington, IN
2/5/1977		Wisconsin	W 90-73	12-5 (4-4)	Iowa Field House; Iowa City, IA
2/7/1977		Michigan State	W 87-79	13-5 (5-4)	Iowa Field House; Iowa City, IA
2/12/1977		No. 8 Minnesota	L 58-61	13-6 (5-5)	Iowa Field House; Iowa City, IA
2/14/1977		at Ohio State	W 74-70	14-6 (6-5)	St. John Arena; Columbus, OH
2/17/1977		at No. 5 Michigan	L 75-99	14-7 (6-6)	Crisler Arena; Ann Arbor, MI
2/19/1977		at Michigan State	L 79-81	14-8 (6-7)	Jenison Fieldhouse; East Lansing, MI
2/24/1977		Illinois	W 76-64	15-8 (7-7)	Iowa Field House; Iowa City, IA
2/26/1977		Purdue	L 70-81	15-9 (7-8)	Iowa Field House; Iowa City, IA
2/28/1977		Indiana	W 80-73	16-9 (8-8)	Iowa Field House; Iowa City, IA
3/3/1977		at Northwestern	W 78-60	17-9 (9-8)	Welsh-Ryan Arena; Evanston, IL
3/5/1977		at Wisconsin	W 94-93	18-9 (10-8)	Wisconsin Field House; Madison, WI
*Non-conference game. ^{#}Rankings from AP Poll. (#) Tournament seedings in parentheses.
