= Jim Killingsworth =

American basketball coach (1923–2007)

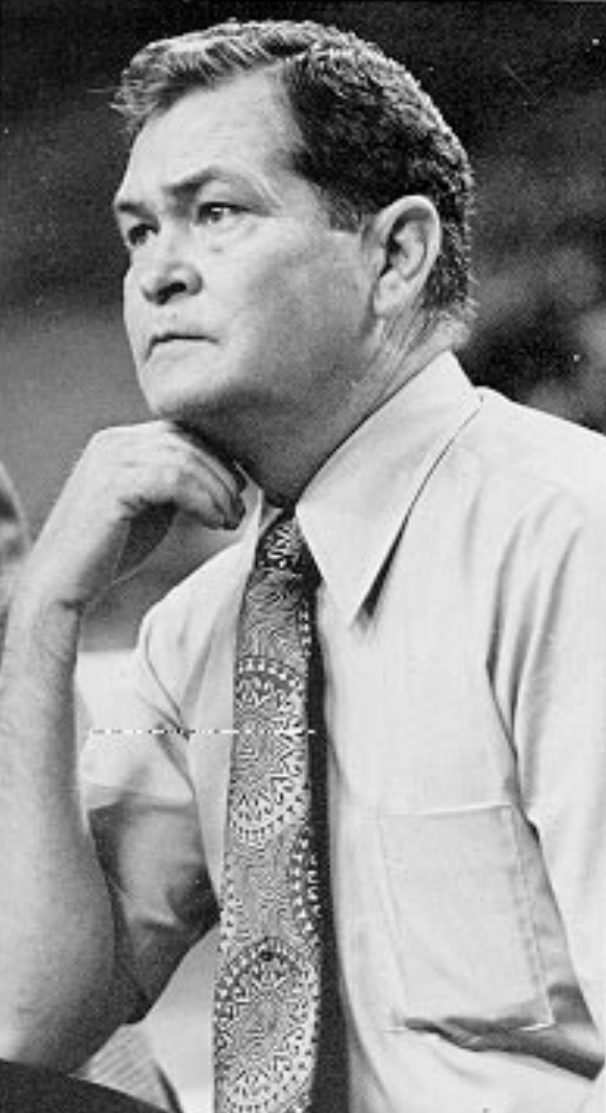
- Killingsworth c. 1972

Biographical details
- Born: June 19, 1923; Checotah, Oklahoma, U.S.
- Died: June 10, 2007 (aged 83); Tulsa, Oklahoma, U.S.

Playing career
- 194x–1948: Northeastern State
- Position: Guard

Coaching career (HC unless noted)
- 1961–1964: Tulsa (freshmen)
- 1964–1971: Cerritos College
- 1971–1977: Idaho State
- 1977–1979: Oklahoma State
- 1979–1987: TCU

Head coaching record
- Overall: 261–191 (college)

Accomplishments and honors

Championships
- 3 Big Sky regular season (1974, 1976, 1977); Big Sky tournament (1977); 2 SWC regular season (1986, 1987)

Awards
- 2× Big Sky Coach of the Year (1974, 1977)

James Austin Killingsworth (June 19, 1923 – June 10, 2007) was an American college basketball coach. He was best known for his tenures at Idaho State University and Texas Christian University (TCU).

Born in Checotah, Oklahoma, Killingsworth played college basketball at Northeastern State College in Tahlequah and began his coaching career in 1948 at the high school level in Oklahoma. After many years of success, he left for the college ranks to coach the freshman team at Tulsa, then took a head coaching job at Cerritos College in southern California in 1964. In seven seasons at Cerritos, Killingsworth compiled a 157–46 record and led the Falcons to the 1968 California junior college championship.

In March 1971, he was hired as head coach at Idaho State in the Big Sky Conference, succeeding Dan Miller. In his six seasons in Pocatello, Killingsworth led the Bengals to a 109–54 (.669) record, including three Big Sky regular-season titles and the second tournament title in 1977. The 1976–77 season was his last at ISU and was capped off by a run to the Elite Eight of the NCAA tournament, following a one-point upset of UCLA in the Sweet Sixteen in Provo, Utah, behind the play of seven-foot (2.13 m) center Steve Hayes. The Bengals led by a point at the half against UNLV, but lost by seventeen and ended the year at 25–5.

Following his successful run at Idaho State, Killingsworth was hired as head coach at Oklahoma State after Kansas State's Jack Hartman took the job and resigned two days later. After two losing seasons, the first in his career at any level, he left the Cowboys to take the head coaching job at TCU in the Southwest Conference (SWC). Nicknamed "Killer" during his time at Fort Worth, Killingsworth raised the profile of a school that had experienced limited basketball success in recent seasons. In eight seasons, he led his team to a 130–106 record, and in 1986–87, he led the team to a 24–7 record, an SWC title, and the team's first NCAA tournament appearance in 16 years. Following that season, Killingsworth retired after 38 years of coaching.

Killingsworth died in Tulsa in 2007 at age 83.

== Head coaching record ==
Record table
Season	Team	Overall	Conference	Standing	Postseason
Idaho State Bengals (Big Sky Conference) (1971–1977)
1971–72	Idaho State	14–12	8–6	T–2nd	
1972–73	Idaho State	18–8	10–4	2nd	
1973–74	Idaho State	20–8	11–3	T–1st	NCAA Division I first round
1974–75	Idaho State	16–10	9–5	2nd	
1975–76	Idaho State	16–11	9–5	T–1st	
1976–77	Idaho State	25–5	13–1	1st	NCAA Division I Elite Eight
Idaho State:		109–54 (.669)	60–24 (.714)		
Oklahoma State Cowboys (Big Eight Conference) (1977–1979)
1977–78	Oklahoma State	10–16	4–10	T–6th	
1978–79	Oklahoma State	12–15	5–9	7th	
Oklahoma State:		22–31 (.415)	9–19 (.321)		
TCU Horned Frogs (Southwest Conference) (1979–1987)
1979–80	TCU	7–19	2–14	9th	
1981–82	TCU	11–18	6–10	8th	
1981–82	TCU	16–13	9–7	T–4th	
1982–83	TCU	23–11	9–7	T–4th	NIT Quarterfinal
1983–84	TCU	11–17	4–12	T–7th	
1984–85	TCU	16–12	8–8	T–6th	
1985–86	TCU	22–9	12–4	T–1st	NIT second round
1986–87	TCU	24–7	14–2	1st	NCAA Division I second round
TCU:		130–106 (.551)	64–64 (.500)		
Total:		261–191 (.577)			
National champion Postseason invitational champion Conference regular season champion Conference regular season and conference tournament champion Division regular season champion Division regular season and conference tournament champion Conference tournament champion

- 1974 team won an unscheduled playoff game for the NCAA berth
