= 1976–77 Louisville Cardinals men's basketball team =

American college basketball season

1976–77 Louisville Cardinals men's basketball

Metro Conference Champions

NCAA tournament
- Conference: Metro Conference (1975–1995)

Ranking
- Coaches: No. 13
- AP: No. 19
- Record: 21–7 (6–1 Metro)
- Head coach: Denny Crum (6th season)
- Assistant coaches: Bill Olsen; Wade Houston; Jerry Jones
- Home arena: Freedom Hall

1976–77 Metro Conference men's basketball standings
	Conf.				Overall
Team	W		L	PCT	W		L	PCT
No. 19 Louisville	6	–	1	.857	21	–	7	.750
Cincinnati †	4	–	2	.667	25	–	5	.833
Georgia Tech	3	–	3	.500	13	–	10	.565
Tulane	3	–	3	.500	10	–	17	.370
Memphis State	3	–	4	.429	20	–	9	.690
Saint Louis	1	–	5	.167	7	–	19	.269
Florida State	0	–	2	.000	16	–	11	.593
† 1977 Metro Conference tournament winner Rankings from AP Poll

The 1976–77 Louisville Cardinals men's basketball team represented the University of Louisville during the 1976–77 NCAA Division I men's basketball season, Louisville's 63rd season of intercollegiate competition. The Cardinals competed in the Metro Conference and were coached by Denny Crum. The team played home games at Freedom Hall.

The team completed a 21–7 record and reached the 1977 NCAA Tournament.

== Roster ==
1976–77 Louisville Cardinals men's basketball team
Players
Coaches

Pos.	#	Name	Height	Weight	Year	Previous school	Hometown
C	13	Ricky Gallon	6 ft 11 in (2.11 m)	—	Jr	Tampa, Florida
G	23	Tony Branch	6 ft 0 in (1.83 m)	175 lb (79 kg)	Fr	Elston	Michigan City, Indiana
G	30	Phil Bond	6 ft 2 in (1.88 m)	175 lb (79 kg)	Sr	duPont Manual	Louisville, Kentucky
G	35	Darrell Griffith	6 ft 4 in (1.93 m)	190 lb (86 kg)	Fr	Louisville Male	Louisville, Kentucky
G	42	Rick Wilson	6 ft 5 in (1.96 m)	195 lb (88 kg)	Jr	Atherton	Louisville, Kentucky

Head coach

- Denny Crum (UCLA)

Assistant coach(es)

- Jerry Jones
- Bill Olsen
- Wade Houston

Legend

- (C) Team captain
- (S) Suspended
- (I) Ineligible
- (W) Walk-on
- Injured
- Current redshirt

== Schedule and results ==
Date time, TV	Rank^{#}	Opponent^{#}	Result	Record	Site city, state
Regular season
Dec 1, 1976*	No. 7	at Vanderbilt	W 81–76 ^{OT}	1–0	Memorial Gymnasium; Nashville, Tennessee
Dec 4, 1976*	No. 7	Syracuse	L 75–76	1–1	Freedom Hall; Louisville, Kentucky
Dec 6, 1976*	No. 14	VCU	W 89–60	2–1	Freedom Hall; Louisville, Kentucky
Dec 8, 1976*	No. 14	Idaho State	W 89–68	3–1	Freedom Hall; Louisville, Kentucky
Dec 11, 1976*	No. 14	at Purdue	L 70–72	3–2	Mackey Arena; West Lafayette, Indiana
Dec 18, 1976*	No. 17	at No. 2 Marquette	W 78–75 ^{OT}	4–2	MECCA Arena; Milwaukee, Wisconsin
Dec 22, 1976*	No. 13	Chattanooga	W 81–71	5–2	Freedom Hall; Louisville, Kentucky
Dec 28, 1976*	No. 14	Rutgers	W 76–68	6–2	Freedom Hall; Louisville, Kentucky
Dec 29, 1976*	No. 14	Creighton	W 69–66 ^{2OT}	7–2	Freedom Hall; Louisville, Kentucky
Jan 3, 1977	No. 14	Florida State	W 78–75 ^{OT}	8–2 (1–0)	Freedom Hall; Louisville, Kentucky
Jan 8, 1977	No. 14	at Tulane	W 90–81	9–2 (2–0)	Avron B. Fogelman Arena; New Orleans, Louisiana
Jan 15, 1977*	No. 13	Marshall	W 104–85	10–2	Freedom Hall; Louisville, Kentucky
Jan 19, 1977	No. 12	No. 2 Cincinnati	W 83–77	11–2 (3–0)	Freedom Hall; Louisville, Kentucky
Jan 22, 1977	No. 12	at Saint Louis	W 74–55	12–2 (4–0)	Kiel Auditorium; St. Louis, Missouri
Jan 24, 1977*	No. 11	Long Island	W 107–68	13–2	Freedom Hall; Louisville, Kentucky
Jan 27, 1977*	No. 11	at Dayton	W 76–71	14–2	UD Arena; Dayton, Ohio
Jan 29, 1977*	No. 11	Rhode Island	W 105–87	15–2	Freedom Hall; Louisville, Kentucky
Feb 5, 1977	No. 9	Memphis State	W 111–92	16–2 (5–0)	Freedom Hall (13,101); Louisville, Kentucky
Feb 6, 1977*	No. 9	No. 15 Providence	W 68–64	17–2	Freedom Hall; Louisville, Kentucky
Feb 9, 1977*	No. 6	Southwestern Louisiana	W 103–82	18–2	Freedom Hall; Louisville, Kentucky
Feb 12, 1977*	No. 6	at No. 10 UNLV	L 96–99	18–3	Las Vegas Convention Center (6,457); Las Vegas, Nevada
Feb 15, 1977*	No. 8	at Tulsa	W 91–67	19–3	Tulsa Convention Center; Tulsa, Oklahoma
Feb 19, 1977	No. 8	at Memphis State	L 77–87	19–4 (5–1)	Mid-South Coliseum (10,896); Memphis, Tennessee
Feb 22, 1977*	No. 10	Northeast Louisiana	W 95–65	20–4	Freedom Hall; Louisville, Kentucky
Feb 25, 1977	No. 10	Georgia Tech	W 91–80	21–4 (6–1)	Freedom Hall; Louisville, Kentucky
Feb 27, 1977*	No. 10	at No. 9 North Carolina	L 89–96	21–5	Carmichael Auditorium; Chapel Hill, North Carolina
Metro Conference Tournament
Mar 4, 1977*	(1) No. 10	vs. (3) Georgia Tech; Semifinals	L 55–56	21–6	Mid-South Coliseum; Memphis, Tennessee
NCAA Tournament
Mar 12, 1977*; 4:15 p.m., NBC	No. 14	vs. No. 2 UCLA; Quarterfinals	L 79–87	21–7	ISU Minidome (10,897); Pocatello, Idaho
*Non-conference game. ^{#}Rankings from AP poll. (#) Tournament seedings in parentheses. W=West. All times are in Eastern.
