= 1977 Missouri Valley Conference men's basketball tournament =

- Classification: Division I
- Season: 1976–77
- Teams: 7
- Site: Levitt Arena; Wichita, KS
- Champions: Southern Illinois (1st title)
- Winning coach: Paul Lambert (1st title)

1976–77 Missouri Valley Conference men's basketball standings
	Conf.				Overall
Team	W		L	PCT	W		L	PCT
Southern Illinois †	8	–	4	.667	22	–	7	.759
New Mexico State	8	–	4	.667	17	–	10	.630
Wichita State	7	–	5	.583	18	–	10	.643
West Texas State	7	–	5	.583	17	–	13	.567
Drake	5	–	7	.417	10	–	17	.370
Bradley	4	–	8	.333	9	–	18	.333
Tulsa	3	–	9	.250	6	–	21	.222
† 1977 MVC tournament winner Rankings from AP Poll

The 1977 Missouri Valley Conference men's basketball tournament was held February 28–March 5 at Levitt Arena on the campus of Wichita State University in Wichita, Kansas. This was the initial edition of the conference tournament.

Top-seeded Southern Illinois defeated West Texas State in the inaugural championship game, 82–69, to win their first men's basketball tournament.

The Salukis, in turn, received a bid to the 1977 NCAA tournament.

== Bracket ==
First round Monday, February 28
4	West Texas State	96
7	Tulsa	81
5	Drake	80
6	Bradley	73

Second round Tuesday, March 1 / Wednesday, March 2
2	New Mexico State	86
4	West Texas State	89
3	Wichita State	67
5	Drake	63

Semifinal; Friday, March 4
4	West Texas State	79
3	Wichita State	68

Final; Saturday, March 5
1	Southern Illinois	82
4	West Texas State	69
