= 1976–77 Weber State Wildcats men's basketball team =

American college basketball season

1976–77 Weber State Wildcats men's basketball
- Conference: Big Sky Conference
- Record: 20–8 (11–3 Big Sky)
- Head coach: Neil McCarthy (2nd season)
- Home arena: Wildcat Gym

1976–77 Big Sky men's basketball standings
| | Conf. | | | | Overall |
| Team | W | | L | PCT | W | | L | PCT |
|---|---|---|---|---|---|---|---|---|
| Idaho State † | 13 | – | 1 | .929 | 25 | – | 5 | .833 |
| Weber State | 11 | – | 3 | .786 | 20 | – | 8 | .714 |
| Gonzaga | 7 | – | 7 | .500 | 11 | – | 16 | .407 |
| Montana State | 6 | – | 8 | .429 | 12 | – | 14 | .462 |
| Northern Arizona | 5 | – | 9 | .357 | 12 | – | 15 | .444 |
| Boise State | 5 | – | 9 | .357 | 10 | – | 16 | .385 |
| Montana | 5 | – | 9 | .357 | 7 | – | 19 | .269 |
| Idaho | 3 | – | 11 | .214 | 5 | – | 21 | .192 |
† Conference tournament winner

The 1976–77 Weber State Wildcats men's basketball team represented Weber State College during the 1976–77 NCAA Division I basketball season. Members of the Big Sky Conference, the Wildcats were led by second-year head coach Neil McCarthy and played their home games on campus at Wildcat Gym in Ogden, Utah. They were 19–7 overall in the regular season and 11–3 in conference play.

Weber State was second in the regular season standings and qualified for the four-team conference tournament, hosted by Idaho State in Pocatello. The Wildcats won their semifinal by a point over underdog Gonzaga; and advanced to the final again, this time to host Idaho State; the teams had split the season series with home wins. The trend continued as Idaho State won the tournament final at home by six points. They advanced to the NCAA Tournament's Elite Eight, upsetting #2 UCLA in the Sweet Sixteen. It remains the best-ever showing in the NCAA tournament by a Big Sky team.

Forward Stan Mayhew was named to the all-conference team, center Jim Erickson was on the second team, and freshman guard Mark Mattos was honorable mention.

Weber State appeared in the first five finals of the conference tournament, and won the next three (1978, 1979, 1980).

This was the last season in Wildcat Gym (now Swenson Gym); the new Dee Events Center opened in November 1977.

== Postseason results ==
| Date time, TV | Rank^{#} | Opponent^{#} | Result | Record | Site (attendance) city, state |
Big Sky tournament
| Fri, March 4; 7:00 pm | (2) | vs. (3) Gonzaga; Semifinal | W 69–68 | 20–7 | ISU Minidome (4,427); Pocatello, Idaho |
| Sat, March 5; 8:00 pm | (2) | at (1) Idaho State; Final | L 55–61 | 20–8 | ISU Minidome (9,300); Pocatello, Idaho |
*Non-conference game. ^{#}Rankings from AP poll. (#) Tournament seedings in parentheses. All times are in Mountain time.
