= Steve Hayes (basketball) =

American basketball player and coach (born 1955)

Personal information
- Born: August 2, 1955 (age 71) American Falls, Idaho, U.S.
- Listed height: 7 ft 0 in (2.13 m)
- Listed weight: 205 lb (93 kg)

Career information
- High school: Aberdeen (Aberdeen, Idaho)
- College: Idaho State (1973–1977)
- NBA draft: 1977: 4th round, 76th overall pick
- Drafted by: New York Knicks
- Playing career: 1977–1990
- Position: Center
- Number: 43, 52, 41, 31, 50

Career history

Playing
- 1977–1979: Sporting Club Gira
- 1979–1980: Anchorage Northern Knights
- 1980–1981: Gorizia
- 1981–1982: Anchorage Northern Knights
- 1981–1982: San Antonio Spurs
- 1982: Detroit Pistons
- 1982–1983: Cleveland Cavaliers
- 1983–1984: Seattle SuperSonics
- 1984–1985: Tampa Bay Thrillers
- 1985: Philadelphia 76ers
- 1985–1986: Utah Jazz
- 1987–1988: Rapid City Thrillers
- 1988–1989: Cedar Rapids Silver Bullets
- 1989–1990: Paris Basket Racing

Coaching
- 1990–1991: Rockford Lightning
- 1991–1993: Tri-City Chinook

Career highlights
- 2× CBA champion (1980, 1985); CBA Playoff/Finals MVP (1980); CBA Most Valuable Player (1985); All-CBA First Team (1985); All-CBA Second Team (1982); CBA All-Defensive First Team (1985); 3× First-team All-Big Sky (1975–1977)
- Stats at NBA.com
- Stats at Basketball Reference

Steven Leonard Hayes (born August 2, 1955) is an American former basketball player and coach. He played for several years for a variety of teams in the National Basketball Association (NBA), as well as in the Continental Basketball Association and in Europe. He is also known for his standout college career at Idaho State University, where he is recognized as one of the best players in the school's history.

== College career ==
Born in American Falls, Idaho, Hayes attended Aberdeen High School in Aberdeen. A 7 ft 0 in (2.13 m) center, he enrolled at Idaho State University in nearby Pocatello. As a freshman, Hayes averaged 9.8 points and 6.8 rebounds per game and was a valuable contributor to a Bengals team that went 20–8, won a share of the Big Sky Conference title, and won a tiebreaker playoff game to earn a berth in the NCAA tournament. As a sophomore, he developed into one of the top players in the conference, averaging 20.4 points and 13.3 rebounds. Hayes led the Big Sky in scoring and rebounding and earned first team All-Conference honors.

In his junior season, Hayes again earned first team All-Conference accolades, averaging 19.7 points and 10.6 rebounds per game (leading the conference in both statistical categories). The Bengals again tied for the conference regular-season title but did not play in the postseason.

His final collegiate season in 1976–77 was a special one for Hayes and the Bengals. Hayes again averaged a double-double at 20.2 points and 11.1 rebounds per game. He was named first team All-Big Sky for the third consecutive year, becoming only the third player in league history to do so. Idaho State went 13–1 in league play to win the regular season championship and captured their first Big Sky tournament title at home to clinch a berth in the 32-team NCAA tournament. Once there, the Bengals made the most of their opportunity. After a win over Long Beach State in the first round of the West regional on their home court, ISU faced national power UCLA in the Sweet Sixteen in Provo, Utah. The Bruins were going for their eleventh consecutive Final Four appearance – an NCAA record. Hayes scored 27 points and recorded 12 rebounds as the Bengals upset UCLA 76–75 as Hayes was named to the All-Regional team.

At the close of his career, Hayes finished second in school history in scoring (1,933 points) and first in rebounding (1,147) and blocked shots (207). He also holds the Big Sky Conference records for total rebounds in a career, career blocked shots per game (3.51) and blocked shots in a game (10 in 1976). He was inducted into the Idaho State athletic Hall of Fame in 1988.

== Professional career ==
Hayes was drafted in the fourth round of the 1977 NBA draft by the New York Knicks (76th pick overall), but did not make the final roster. Instead, he signed with Fernet Tonic Bologna in Italy, where he played for two seasons, averaging 19.3 points and 8.6 rebounds per game.

For the 1979–80 season, Hayes returned to the United States to play for the Anchorage Northern Knights of the Continental Basketball Association, where he teamed up with future NBA players Brad Davis and Ron Davis to win the 1980 CBA championship. Hayes averaged 19.7 points, 11.8 rebounds and 3.0 blocks per game in the playoffs (up from his regular season averages of 11.6, 7.8 and 1.5 respectively) and was named CBA Playoff MVP.

Hayes returned to Italy for the next season and averaged 18.1 points and 10.7 rebounds for Tai Ginseng Gorizia. For the 1981–82 season, Hayes finally made his NBA debut for the San Antonio Spurs on December 30, 1981. He split the season between the Spurs, Detroit Pistons and Anchorage Northern Knights. The next couple of seasons, Hayes played a reserve role for several NBA teams: the Cleveland Cavaliers, Seattle SuperSonics, the Philadelphia 76ers and the Utah Jazz. His career NBA averages over five seasons were 2.5 points and 2.6 rebounds per game.

In the middle of his time with the NBA, Hayes had a standout season for the Tampa Bay Thrillers of the CBA in 1984–85. He averaged 20.5 points and 8.9 rebounds per game and was named CBA MVP for the season. He won the CBA championship with the Thrillers in 1985. He also played parts of two seasons with the Rapid City Thrillers and Cedar Rapids Silver Bullets after his last NBA game. His career CBA averages were 14.7 points and 8.1 rebounds per game. Hayes also played briefly in France after the completion of his United States career.

== Coaching career and life after basketball ==
Following the close of his playing career, Hayes became an assistant coach for the CBA's Cedar Rapids Silver Bullets in 1990, then was named head coach of the Rockford Lightning for the 1990–91 CBA season, leading the team to a 23–33 record. He then moved to the Tri-City Chinook to become the team's head coach and general manager. In two seasons with the Chinook, Hayes compiled a 42–46 record.

Hayes stepped away from professional basketball in 1994 to accept a fundraising role in the Idaho State athletic department. While there, he also served as the interim women's basketball coach for the 1995–96 season, going 8–18 in his one season.

Hayes left Idaho State for an IT consulting opportunity and has continued on in business roles. He is a board member for the National Basketball Retired Players Association, serving as secretary of that organization.

== Career statistics ==
Legend
GP	Games played	GS	Games started	MPG	Minutes per game
FG%	Field goal percentage	3P%	3-point field goal percentage	FT%	Free throw percentage
RPG	Rebounds per game	APG	Assists per game	SPG	Steals per game
BPG	Blocks per game	PPG	Points per game	**Bold**	Career high

=== NBA ===
==== Regular season ====
Year	Team	GP	GS	MPG	FG%	3P%	FT%	RPG	APG	SPG	BPG	PPG
1981–82	San Antonio	9	0	8.3	.444	–	.583	1.9	.4	.1	.2	2.6
1981–82	Detroit	26	0	15.8	.495	–	**.610**	**3.8**	**.9**	.1	**.7**	**4.5**
1982–83	Cleveland	**65**	**3**	**16.3**	.479	.000	.569	3.6	.6	**.3**	.6	3.6
1983–84	Seattle	43	0	5.9	.520	–	.357	1.4	.3	.1	.4	1.3
1984–85	Philadelphia	11	0	9.2	**.556**	–	.500	3.1	.1	.1	.4	2.0
1985–86	Utah	58	0	6.8	.448	–	.306	1.3	.1	.1	.3	1.5
Career		212	3	10.8	.482	.000	.500	2.5	.4	.2	.5	2.6

==== Playoffs ====
Year	Team	GP	GS	MPG	FG%	3P%	FT%	RPG	APG	SPG	BPG	PPG
1986	Utah	1	0	2.0	1.000	–	–	1.0	.0	.0	.0	2.0
