= 1976–77 Gonzaga Bulldogs men's basketball team =

American college basketball season

1976–77 Gonzaga Bulldogs men's basketball
- Conference: Big Sky Conference
- Record: 11–16 (7–7 Big Sky)
- Head coach: Adrian Buoncristiani (5th season)
- Home arena: Kennedy Pavilion

1976–77 Big Sky men's basketball standings
	Conf.				Overall
Team	W		L	PCT	W		L	PCT
Idaho State †	13	–	1	.929	25	–	5	.833
Weber State	11	–	3	.786	20	–	8	.714
Gonzaga	7	–	7	.500	11	–	16	.407
Montana State	6	–	8	.429	12	–	14	.462
Northern Arizona	5	–	9	.357	12	–	15	.444
Boise State	5	–	9	.357	10	–	16	.385
Montana	5	–	9	.357	7	–	19	.269
Idaho	3	–	11	.214	5	–	21	.192
† Conference tournament winner

The 1976–77 Gonzaga Bulldogs men's basketball team represented Gonzaga University during the 1976–77 NCAA Division I basketball season. Members of the Big Sky Conference, the Bulldogs were led by fifth-year head coach Adrian Buoncristiani and played their home games on campus at Kennedy Pavilion in Spokane, Washington. They were 11–15 in the regular season and 7–7 in conference play.

Gonzaga was third in the regular season standings and qualified for the four-team conference tournament, hosted by Idaho State in Pocatello. The Bulldogs lost by a point in the semifinals to favored Weber State; ISU won the tournament and advanced to the NCAA Tournament's Elite Eight, upsetting #2 UCLA in the Sweet Sixteen. It remains the best-ever showing in the NCAA tournament by a Big Sky team.

This was the Zags' sole appearance in the postseason while in the Big Sky, narrowly missing the next two conference tournaments. They joined the West Coast Athletic Conference (WCAC, now WCC) in the summer of 1979, and its tourney debuted in 1987.

Senior forward Jim Grady was on the all-conference team, and center Willie Moss was honorable mention.

== Schedule ==
Date time, TV	Rank^{#}	Opponent^{#}	Result	Record	Site city, state
Nov 29, 1976*		at Whitworth	W 89–57	1–0	
Nov 30, 1976*		at Puget Sound	W 76–64	2–0	
Dec 3, 1976*		Washington State	L 57–66	2–1	Spokane Coliseum
Dec 9, 1976*		at Wisconsin-Milwaukee	L 62–80	2–2	
Dec 10, 1976*		at Depaul	L 53–77	2–3	
Dec 13, 1976*		at Seattle University	W 62–59	3–3	
Dec 22, 1976*		at Saint Mary’s	L 80–82	3–4	
Dec 23, 1976*		at Univ. Of The Pacific	L 60–70	3–5	
Dec 28, 1976*		at Portland State	L 59–74	3–6	
Dec 29, 1976*		at Loyola Marymount	L 59–68	3–7	
Jan 7, 1977		at Boise State	W 68–61	4–7	
Jan 8, 1977		at Idaho State	L 59–60	4–8	
Jan 14, 1977		at Idaho	L 65–68	4–9	
Jan 15, 1977*		at Creighton	L 83–100	4–10	
Jan 21, 1977		at Idaho	W 92–68	5–10	
Jan 22, 1977*		at Air Force	W 68–55	6–10	
Jan 28, 1977		at Montana	L 50–53	6–11	
Jan 29, 1977		at Montana State	L 68–81	6–12	
Feb 4, 1977		at Montana	W 63–60	7–12	
Feb 5, 1977		at Montana State	W 93–69	8–12	
Feb 10, 1977		at Northern Arizona	W 71–70	9–12	
Feb 12, 1977		at Weber State	L 72–84	9–13	
Feb 18, 1977		at Northern Arizona	W 76–62	10–13	
Feb 19, 1977		at Weber State	W 62–61	11–13	
Feb 25, 1977		at Boise State	L 84–100	11–14	
Feb 26, 1977		at Idaho State	L 66–103	11–15	
Fri, March 4; 6:00 pm	(3)	vs. (2) Weber State; Semifinal	L 68–69	11–16	ISU Minidome (4,427); Pocatello, Idaho
*Non-conference game. ^{#}Rankings from AP Poll. (#) Tournament seedings in parentheses.
