= List of Arizona Wildcats men's basketball head coaches =

The following is a list of Arizona Wildcats men's basketball head coaches. The Wildcats have had 18 coaches in their 122-season history. One Arizona coach has been enshrined in the Naismith Memorial Basketball Hall of Fame: Lute Olson. The current head coach of Arizona Wildcat is Tommy Lloyd.

== Key statistics ==
Statistics are correct as of the 2025–26 college basketball season.

General
#	Number of coaches (Note: A running total of the number of head coaches.)
**GC**	Games coached
**OW**	Overall Wins
**OL**	Overall Losses
**O%**	Winning percentage
**CW**	Conference Wins
**CL**	Conference Losses
**C%**	Winning percentage

Overall
**OW**	Wins
**OL**	Losses
**O%**	Winning percentage

Conference (Note: The Longhorns played as part of the Southern Intercollegiate Athletic Association from their first years until joining the Texas Intercollegiate Athletic Association in 1907. Texas led the creation of the Southwest Conference in 1915, which became the Big 12 Conference after a merger in 1997.)
**CW**	Wins
**CL**	Losses
**C%**	Winning percentage

NCAA Tournament (Note: Postseason play involving the NCAA Division I men's basketball tournament.)
**TA**	Total appearances (Note: NCAA Division I men's basketball tournament appearances since the tournament began in 1939.)
**TW**	Total wins
**TL**	Total losses

Championships
**NC**	National championships
**CC**	Conference regular season
**CT**	Conference tournaments
**HC**	Helms champion
**NIT**	NIT champion

Coaching awards
†	Elected to the National Collegiate Basketball Hall of Fame
FHOF	FIBA Hall of Fame
BHOF	Basketball Hall of Fame
NMBHOF	Naismith Memorial Basketball Hall of Fame
NCHOF	National Collegiate Basketball Hall of Fame
LOCA	Legend of Coaching Award
SN	Sporting News Coach of the Year
NABC	National Association of Basketball Coaches Coach of the Year
N	Naismith Coach of the Year
BT	Basketball Times Coach of the Year
USBWA	U.S. Basketball Writers Association
UPI	United Press International Coach of the Year
CBS	CBS/Chevrolet Coach of the Year
AP	Associated Press College Basketball Coach of the Year
ARC	Adolph Rupp Cup
SY	Sportsman of the Year
OGM	Olympic Gold Medal
Pac-12	Pac-12 Coach of the Year
Big 12	Big 12 Coach of the Year

Bold = leader in each category

== Coaches ==
Coaching awards are only listed if won while the individual was the coach of Arizona.

List of head basketball coaches showing season(s) coached, overall records, conference records, NCAA Tournament records, championships and selected awards. Statistics correct as of 2026 Season.
No.	Coach	Years at UA	Total seasons	Wins-Loss (Win %)	Conf. wins-losses (win %)	Awards and achievements during tenure
1	Orin A. Kates	1904–1906	2	1–0–1 (.750)	--	
2	No coach	1906–1911	5	10–6 (.625)	--	
3	Frank L. Kleeberger	1911–1912	1	2–2 (.500)	--	
4	Raymond L. Quigley	1912–1914	2	10–4 (.714)	--	
5	Pop McKale	1914–1921	7	49–12 (.803)	--	
6	James Pierce	1921–1923	2	10–2 (.833)	--	
7	Basil Stanley	1923–1924	1	31–6 (.838)	--	
8	Walter Davis	1924–1925	1	7–4 (.636)	--	
9	Fred Enke	1925–1961	36	509–324 (.611)	232–138 (.627)	--
10	Bruce Larson	1961–1972	11	136–148 (.479)	44–68 (.393)	--
11	Fred Snowden	1972–1982	10	167–108 (.607)	82–146 (.360)	• WAC Coach of the Year (1973)
12	Ben Lindsey	1982–1983	1	4–24 (.143)	1–17 (.056)	--
13	Lute Olson†+	1983–2007	24	589–187 (.759)	327–101 (.764)	• 11 Pac-10 Conference regular season championships • 4 Pac-10 Conference championships •1997 National champions •Clair Bee Coach of the Year Award (2001) •7× Pac-10 Coach of the Year (1986, 1988-89, 1993-94, 1998, 2003)
14	Jim Rosborough^	2000–2001	interim	3–2 (.600)	--	
15	Kevin O'Neill++	2007–2008	1	19–15 (.559)	8–10 (.444)	--
16	Russ Pennell+++	2008–2009	1	21–14 (.600)	9–9 (.500)	--
17	Sean Miller++++	2009–2021	12	302–109 (.735)	153–74 (.674)	•3 Pac-12 Conference Men's Basketball Coach of the Year (2011, 2014, 2017) •5 Pac-10/12 Conference regular season championships •3 Pac-12 Conference championships • USA Basketball National Co-Coach of the Year (2015)
18	Tommy Lloyd	2021–present*	6	148–36 (.804)	77–21 (.786)	•2 Pac-12 Conference regular season championships (2022, 2024) •2 Pac-12 Conference championships (2022, 2023) •1 Big 12 Conference regular season championship (2026) •1 Big 12 Conference championship (2026) •AP Coach of the Year (2022) •NABC Coach of the Year (2022) •USBWA Coach of the Year (2022) •Pac-12 Coach of the Year (2022) •USA Basketball Junior Coach of the Year (2025) •Big 12 Coach of the Year (2026) •Sporting News Coach of the Year (2026) • Naismith Coach of the Year (2026) •Highest conference winning percentage in program history
Totals		1904–present	122	2,018–1,002–1 (.668)	992–513 (.659)	--

NCAA Tournament
	Coach	Appearances
National Champions	Lute Olson	1
Final Four	Lute Olson	4
Final Four	Tommy Lloyd	1
Elite Eight	Lute Olson	3
Elite Eight	Sean Miller	3
Elite Eight	Fred Snowden	1
Elite Eight	Tommy Lloyd	1
Sweet Sixteen	Lute Olson	11
Sweet Sixteen	Sean Miller	5
Sweet Sixteen	Tommy Lloyd	4
Sweet Sixteen	Russ Pennell	1

== Notes ==
* Only intrasquad games were played in 1905–06.

+ Record for the 1999 and 2008 were vacated by NCAA due to NCAA infractions. Actual on-court records was 589-188 for Lute Olson and 19–15 for Kevin O'Neil.

^ Rosborough served as head coach for five games during the 2000–01 campaign while Olson took a leave of absence. Arizona was 28–8 overall and 15–3 in Pac-10 play that season.

++ O'Neill served as interim head coach while Olson missed the season due to a leave of absence.

+++ Pennell served as interim head coach following Olson's retirement in October 2008.

++++ The NCAA vacated 32 wins from the 2016–17 season, and 18 wins from the 2017–18 season as a result of the 2017–18 NCAA men's basketball corruption scandal. The players involved in the scandal played in every game in the 2016–17 & 23 games in the 2017–18 season, resulting in a 9–8 record.

An asterisk (*) denotes a season currently in progress.

† – Inducted into the Naismith Memorial Basketball Hall of Fame.
