= 1977 Metro Conference men's basketball tournament =

- Classification: Division I
- Season: 1976–77
- Teams: 6
- Site: Mid-South Coliseum; Memphis, TN
- Champions: Cincinnati (2nd title)
- Winning coach: Gale Catlett (2nd title)
- MVP: Gary Yoder (Cincinnati)

1976–77 Metro Conference men's basketball standings
	Conf.				Overall
Team	W		L	PCT	W		L	PCT
No. 19 Louisville	6	–	1	.857	21	–	7	.750
Cincinnati †	4	–	2	.667	25	–	5	.833
Georgia Tech	3	–	3	.500	13	–	10	.565
Tulane	3	–	3	.500	10	–	17	.370
Memphis State	3	–	4	.429	20	–	9	.690
Saint Louis	1	–	5	.167	7	–	19	.269
Florida State	0	–	2	.000	16	–	11	.593
† 1977 Metro Conference tournament winner Rankings from AP Poll

The 1977 Metro Conference men's basketball tournament was held March 3–5 at the Mid-South Coliseum in Memphis, Tennessee.

Defending champions Cincinnati defeated Georgia Tech in the championship game, 74–61, to win their second Metro men's basketball tournament.

The Bearcats, in turn, received a bid to the 1977 NCAA Tournament. They were joined by fellow Metro member, and tournament runner-up, Louisville, who earned an at-large bid.

== Format ==
All seven of the conference's members participated in the tournament field, including new member Florida State. They were seeded based on regular season conference records, with the top team earning a bye into the semifinal round. The other six teams entered into the preliminary first round.

== Bracket ==
First round Thursday, March 3
7	Florida State	67
3	Georgia Tech	72
4	Tulane	80
5	Memphis State	94
6	Saint Louis	68
2	Cincinnati	76

Semifinals; Friday, March 4
1	Louisville	55
3	Georgia Tech	56
5	Memphis State	67
2	Cincinnati	68

Championship; Saturday, March 5
3	Georgia Tech	61
2	Cincinnati	74
