= Sam Smith (basketball, born 1955) =

American basketball player

Personal information
- Born: January 8, 1955 (age 71) Ferriday, Louisiana, U.S.
- Listed height: 6 ft 4 in (1.93 m)
- Listed weight: 200 lb (91 kg)

Career information
- High school: Ed W. Clark (Las Vegas, Nevada)
- College: Seminole State (1973–1975); UNLV (1975–1977)
- NBA draft: 1977: 3rd round, 48th overall pick
- Drafted by: Atlanta Hawks
- Playing career: 1978–1980
- Position: Shooting guard
- Number: 5, 28

Career history
- 1978: Kentucky Stallions
- 1978–1979: Salt Lake City Prospectors
- 1979: Milwaukee Bucks
- 1979–1980: Chicago Bulls
- Stats at NBA.com
- Stats at Basketball Reference

Sam Smith (born January 8, 1955) is an American former professional basketball player in the National Basketball Association (NBA).

== College career ==
A 6'4" tall shooting guard, Smith played college basketball at the UNLV, during the 1970s. He helped the Runnin' Rebels reach their first ever NCAA Final Four in 1977, as a member of the fabled "Hardway Eight", that was coached by Jerry Tarkanian.

== Professional career ==
Smith played two seasons (1978–1980) in the NBA, as a member of the Milwaukee Bucks and Chicago Bulls. He averaged 6.8 points per game during his NBA career. Smith completed the first four-point play in the NBA's history, on October 21, 1979.

== Personal life ==
Smith was born in Ferriday, Louisiana. He is now living in Las Vegas, and working as an AAU basketball trainer and coach at the Bill and Lilly Heinrich YMCA. Where he worked with his fellow UNLV legend and teammate, Robert Smith.

== Career statistics ==
Legend
GP	Games played	GS	Games started	MPG	Minutes per game
FG%	Field goal percentage	3P%	3-point field goal percentage	FT%	Free throw percentage
RPG	Rebounds per game	APG	Assists per game	SPG	Steals per game
BPG	Blocks per game	PPG	Points per game	**Bold**	Career high

=== NBA ===
==== Regular season ====
Year	Team	GP	MPG	FG%	3P%	FT%	RPG	APG	SPG	BPG	PPG
1978–79	Milwaukee	16	7.8	.404		.750	.6	1.0	.5	**.4**	3.5
1979–80	Chicago	**30**	**16.5**	**.422**	.229	**.905**	**1.8**	**1.4**	**.8**	.2	**8.6**
Career		46	13.5	.419	.229	.862	1.4	1.3	.7	.3	6.8
