= 1975–76 Arizona Wildcats men's basketball team =

American college basketball season

1975–76 Arizona Wildcats men's basketball

WAC Champions

NCAA tournament, Elite Eight
- Conference: Western Athletic Conference

Ranking
- Coaches: No. 12
- AP: No. 15
- Record: 22–9 (11–3 WAC)
- Head coach: Fred Snowden (4th season)
- Assistant coaches: Ken Maxey (3rd season); Dave Toney (1st season); Steve Kanner (1st season)
- Home arena: McKale Center

1975–76 WAC men's basketball standings
	Conf.				Overall
Team	W		L	PCT	W		L	PCT
No. 15 Arizona	11	–	3	.786	24	–	9	.727
UTEP	9	–	5	.643	19	–	7	.731
Utah	9	–	5	.643	19	–	8	.704
New Mexico	8	–	6	.571	16	–	11	.593
BYU	6	–	8	.429	12	–	14	.462
Colorado State	6	–	8	.429	10	–	14	.417
Arizona State	5	–	9	.357	16	–	11	.593
Wyoming	2	–	12	.143	10	–	17	.370
Rankings from AP Poll

The 1975–76 Arizona Wildcats men's basketball team represented the University of Arizona in the 1975–76 NCAA Division I men's basketball season. Coached by fourth year head coach Fred Snowden and led by junior center Bob Elliott, the Wildcats made their first NCAA tournament appearance in 25 seasons (and second appearance all-time), advancing to the Elite Eight. The Wildcats played their home games for the fourth season at the McKale Center in Tucson, Arizona competing as members of the Western Athletic Conference.

== Previous season ==
The Wildcats finished the 1974–75 season 22-7 overall, 9-5 in WAC play to finish in 3rd place in the conference, a three-win improvement from the season before. While beginning the season ranked pre-season #15, the team finished the season unranked and failed to make a postseason appearance for the 24th consecutive season.

== Roster ==
1975–76 Arizona Wildcats men's basketball team
Players
Coaches

Pos.	#	Name	Height	Weight	Year	Previous school	Hometown
G	00	Gilbert Myles	6 ft 2 in (1.88 m)	175 lb (79 kg)	So	Edison HS	Fresno, California
G	11	Sylvester Maxey	5 ft 11 in (1.8 m)	170 lb (77 kg)	Sr	Carver HS	Chicago, Illinois
G	12	Gary Harrison	6 ft 2 in (1.88 m)	180 lb (82 kg)	Jr	Willow Run HS	Ypsilanti, Michigan
G	14	Tom Ehlmann	6 ft 3 in (1.91 m)	170 lb (77 kg)	So	St. Charles HS	St. Charles, Missouri
G	15	Jim Rappis	6 ft 2 in (1.88 m)	185 lb (84 kg)	Sr	Waukesha HS	Waukesha, Wisconsin
G/F	21	Len Gordy	6 ft 5 in (1.96 m)	180 lb (82 kg)	Jr	Chester HS	Chester, Pennsylvania
F	22	Tim Marshall	6 ft 4 in (1.93 m)	180 lb (82 kg)	So	Central HS	Pontiac, Michigan
G	23	Greg Lloyd	6 ft 2 in (1.88 m)	165 lb (75 kg)	Fr	Eastern HS	Lansing, Michigan
G/F	24	Herman Harris	6 ft 5 in (1.96 m)	200 lb (91 kg)	Jr	Chester HS	Chester, Pennsylvania
G/F	25	Ron Fuller	6 ft 4 in (1.93 m)	195 lb (88 kg)	Fr	Southwest HS	Atlanta, Georgia
F	32	Larry Demic	6 ft 8 in (2.03 m)	225 lb (102 kg)	Fr	Westside HS	Gary, Indiana
C	33	Brian Jung	7 ft 0 in (2.13 m)	225 lb (102 kg)	Fr	Canyon del Oro HS	Tucson, Arizona
F	34	Mitch Jones	6 ft 7 in (2.01 m)	210 lb (95 kg)	So	East HS	Rochester, New York
C	41	Bob Aleksa	6 ft 10 in (2.08 m)	220 lb (100 kg)	Jr	East HS	Aurora, Illinois
F	42	Jay Geldmacher	6 ft 8 in (2.03 m)	210 lb (95 kg)	Jr	Elgin HS	Elgin, Illinois
C	44	Jerome Gladney	6 ft 8 in (2.03 m)	225 lb (102 kg)	Jr	King HS	Detroit, Michigan
F	52	Phil Taylor	6 ft 8 in (2.03 m)	225 lb (102 kg)	So	Manual HS	Denver, Colorado
F	54	Al Fleming	6 ft 8 in (2.03 m)	215 lb (98 kg)	Sr	Elston HS	Michigan City, Indiana
F/C	55	Bob Elliott	6 ft 10 in (2.08 m)	225 lb (102 kg)	Jr	Pioneer HS	Ann Arbor, Michigan

Head coach

- Fred Snowden (Wayne State (MI))

Assistant coach(es)

- Ken Maxey (Michigan)
- Dave Toney (Purdue)
- Steve Kanner (Arizona)

Legend

- (C) Team captain
- (S) Suspended
- (I) Ineligible
- (W) Walk-on
- Injured
- Current redshirt

== Schedule and results ==
Date time, TV	Rank^{#}	Opponent^{#}	Result	Record	Site (attendance) city, state
Regular season
November 28, 1975*	No. 11	Oregon State	W 96-67	1-0	McKale Center; Tucson, Arizona
December 3, 1975*	No. 11	Idaho	W 88-62	2-0	McKale Center; Tucson, Arizona
December 6, 1975*	No. 11	Northern Arizona	W 98-81	3-0	McKale Center; Tucson, Arizona
December 8, 1975*	No. 11	at No. 18 Kansas State	L 61-71	3-1	Ahearn Field House; Manhattan, Kansas
December 10, 1975*	No. 10	at No. 16 UNLV	L 94-98	3-2	Las Vegas Convention Center; Las Vegas, Nevada
December 12, 1975*	No. 10	Idaho State	L 82-87	3-3	McKale Center; Tucson, Arizona
December 13, 1975*	No. 10	SMU	W 83-81	4-3	McKale Center; Tucson, Arizona
December 20, 1975*		at Illinois	L 60-66	4-4	Assembly Hall; Champaign, Illinois
December 27, 1975*		vs. No. 6 Cincinnati; Rainbow Classic	W 71-64	5-4	Neal S. Blaisdell Center; Honolulu, Hawaii
December 29, 1975*		vs. Iowa; Rainbow Classic	L 80-82	5-5	Neal S. Blaisdell Center; Honolulu, Hawaii
December 30, 1975*		at Hawaii; Rainbow Classic	W 84-74	6-5	Neal S. Blaisdell Center; Honolulu, Hawaii
January 6, 1976*		Cal State Fullerton	W 85-70	7-5	McKale Center; Tucson, Arizona
January 10, 1976*		Detroit Mercy	W 106-76	8-5	McKale Center; Tucson, Arizona
January 16, 1976		BYU	W 79-78	9-5 (1-0)	McKale Center; Tucson, Arizona
January 17, 1976		Utah	W 87-77	10-5 (2-0)	McKale Center; Tucson, Arizona
January 23, 1976		at UTEP	L 42-61	10-6 (2-1)	Memorial Gym; El Paso, Texas
January 24, 1976		at New Mexico	W 80-79	11-6 (3-1)	The Pit; Albuquerque, New Mexico
January 27, 1976*		Portland State	W 114-94	12-6	McKale Center; Tucson, Arizona
January 30, 1975		Colorado State	W 94-76	13-6 (4-1)	McKale Center; Tucson, Arizona
January 31, 1976		Wyoming	W 64-57	14-6 (5-1)	McKale Center; Tucson, Arizona
February 7, 1976		at Arizona State	L 63-67	14-7 (5-2)	ASU Activity Center; Tempe, Arizona
February 13, 1976		at Utah	W 89-76	15-7 (6-2)	Special Events Center; Salt Lake City, Utah
February 14, 1976		at BYU	L 74-79	15-8 (6-3)	Marriott Center; Provo, Utah
February 20, 1976		New Mexico	W 67-65	16-8 (7-3)	McKale Center; Tucson, Arizona
February 21, 1976		UTEP	W 64-45	17-8 (8-3)	McKale Center; Tucson, Arizona
February 27, 1976		at Wyoming	W 74-66	18-8 (9-3)	War Memorial Fieldhouse; Laramie, Wyoming
February 28, 1976		at Colorado State	W 78-72	19-8 (10-3)	Auditorium-Gymnasium; Fort Collins, Colorado
March 6, 1976		Arizona State	W 77-72	20-8 (11-3)	McKale Center; Tucson, Arizona
NCAA Tournament
March 13, 1976*	No. 18	vs. Georgetown; Quarterfinals	W 83-76	21-8	ASU Activity Center; Tempe, Arizona
March 18, 1976*	No. 18	vs. No. 3 UNLV; Sweet Sixteen	W 114-109 ^{OT}	22-8	Pauley Pavilion; Los Angeles, California
March 20, 1976*	No. 18	at No. 5 UCLA; Elite Eight	L 66-82	22-9	Pauley Pavilion; Los Angeles, California
*Non-conference game. ^{#}Rankings from AP Poll. (#) Tournament seedings in parentheses. All times are in Mountain.

== Rankings ==
Ranking movements Legend: ██ Increase in ranking ██ Decrease in ranking — = Not ranked
	Week																
Poll	Pre	1	2	3	4	5	6	7	8	9	10	11	12	13	14	15	Final
AP	11	11	10	—	—	—	—	—	—	—	—	—	—	—	—	—	15

== Player statistics ==
Individual player statistics (final)
		Scoring		Total FGs			Free-throws			Rebounds	
Player	GP	Pts	Avg	FG	FGA	Pct	FT	FTA	Pct	Tot	PF
Bob Elliott	33	595	18.0	225	406	55.4%	145	225	64.4%	341	86
Al Fleming	33	527	16.0	207	354	58.5%	113	152	74.3%	329	108
Jim Rappis	32	383	12.0	165	354	46.6%	53	71	74.6%	65	82
Herman Harris	33	346	10.8	162	358	45.3%	22	42	52.4%	120	71
Gilbert Myles	29	273	9.4	105	242	43.4%	63	81	77.8%	59	73
Len Gordy	33	201	6.1	80	182	44.0%	41	59	69.5%	156	54
Phil Taylor	31	198	6.4	87	158	55.1%	24	41	58.5%	160	56
Gary Harrison	23	92	4.0	40	103	38.8%	12	19	63.2%	26	16
Jerome Gladney	24	54	2.3	18	46	39.1%	18	31	58.1%	72	25
Sylvester Maxey	12	11	0.9	3	6	50.0%	5	6	83.3%	1	11
Bob Aleksa	12	8	0.7	3	6	50.0%	2	6	33.3%	7	2
Larry Demic	7	4	0.6	2	7	28.6%	0	0	-	5	1
Tim Marshall	10	4	0.4	2	10	20.0%	0	1	00.0%	4	5
Tom Ehlmann	2	3	1.5	0	0	-	3	4	75.0%	0	1
Brian Jung	6	3	0.5	1	2	50.0%	1	2	50.0%	4	0
Ron Fuller	1	2	2.0	1	1	100.0%	0	0	-	0	0
Mitch Jones	2	0	0.0	0	3	00.0%	0	0	-	0	1
Total	33	2704	81.9	1101	2238	49.2%	502	740	67.8%	1475	592

Legend
GP	Games played	GS	Games started	Avg	Average per game
FG	Field-goals made	FGA	Field-goal attempts	FT	Free-throws made
FTA	Free-Throw attempts	PF	Personal fouls	TO	Turnovers
