= Idaho State Bengals men's basketball =

2026–27 Idaho State Bengals men's basketball team
- University: Idaho State University
- Head coach: Ryan Looney (8th season)
- Location: Pocatello, Idaho
- Arena: Reed Gym (capacity: 3,214)
- Conference: Big Sky
- Nickname: Bengals
- Colors: Orange and black

NCAA Division I tournament Elite Eight
- 1977
Other NCAA Division I tournament results
Sweet Sixteen	1954, 1957, 1958, 1959, 1977
Appearances	1953, 1954, 1955, 1956, 1957, 1958, 1959, 1960, 1974, 1977, 1987

Conference tournament champions
- (Big Sky) 1977, 1987

Conference regular-season champions
- (RMAC) 1953, 1954, 1955, 1956, 1957, 1958, 1959, 1960, 1961 (Big Sky) 1974, 1976, 1977

The Idaho State Bengals men's basketball team represents Idaho State University in the Big Sky Conference in NCAA Division I. Currently led by head coach Ryan Looney, the Bengals play their home games on campus at Reed Gym in Pocatello, Idaho. Prior to the 2019–20 season, home games were primarily played at the ICCU Dome (formerly known as Holt Arena), with Reed as a secondary venue. The Bengals have appeared in eleven NCAA Tournaments, most recently in 1987.

== Postseason ==
=== NCAA tournament results ===
The Bengals have appeared in eleven NCAA Tournaments and have a cumulative record of 8–13. The team came to national prominence as a member of Rocky Mountain Athletic Conference (RMAC) under head coach Steve Belko, who arrived in 1950 and stayed for six seasons, followed by John Grayson for the next three. Belko left for Oregon, Grayson for Washington.

In the sixth season under head coach Jim Killingsworth, Idaho State advanced to the Elite Eight in 1977. It was a 32-team field, and remains the furthest any Big Sky team has advanced in the NCAA tourney. The Bengals won an opening round game at home at the Minidome and then upset second-ranked UCLA by a point in the Sweet Sixteen in Provo, Utah. Both teams entered the game with records of 24–4. After the high-scoring loss to fourth-ranked UNLV in the regional final, Killingsworth left for Oklahoma State.

Year	Seed	Round	Opponent	Result
1953		Round of 22	Seattle	L 77–88
1954		Round of 24; Sweet Sixteen; Regional 3rd Place	Seattle; USC; Colorado State	W 77–75^{OT} L 59–73; W 62–57
1955		Round of 24	Seattle	L 63–80
1956		Round of 25	Seattle	L 66–68
1957		Round of 23; Sweet Sixteen; Regional 3rd Place	Hardin–Simmons; San Francisco; BYU	W 68–57; L 51–66; L 54–65
1958		Round of 24; Sweet Sixteen; Regional 3rd Place	Arizona State; California; San Francisco	W 72–68; L 43–54; L 51–57
1959		Round of 23; Sweet Sixteen; Regional 3rd Place	New Mexico State; Saint Mary's; Utah	W 62–61; L 71–80; W 71–65
1960		Round of 25	California	L 44–71
1974		Round of 32	New Mexico	L 65–73
1977		Round of 32; Sweet Sixteen; Elite Eight	Long Beach State #2 UCLA #4 UNLV	W 83–72; W 76–75; L 90–107
1987	16 W	Round of 64	(1 W) #1 UNLV	L 70–95

- Through 2023, Idaho State has not participated in the National Invitation Tournament (NIT).

=== NAIA Tournament results ===
The Bengals appeared in one NAIA Tournament, with a record of 1–1.

Year	Round	Opponent	Result
1938	First Round; Second Round	Manchester (IN); New Mexico State	W 41–38; L 40–56

=== Idaho State Bengals in the NBA/ABA ===
- Ron Boone (SG), 1969–1981, 4 x All-Star, 1041 consecutive games
- Jeff Cook (PF), 1980–1988
- Greg Griffin (SF), 1978–1978
- Steve Hayes (C), 1981–1986
- Charles Parks (F), 1969–1969
- Dale Wilkinson (PF), 1985–1985
