= 1977 Big Sky Conference men's basketball tournament =

- Classification: Division I
- Season: 1976–77
- Teams: 4
- Site: ISU Minidome; Pocatello, Idaho
- Champions: Idaho State (1st title)
- Winning coach: Jim Killingsworth (1st title)
- MVP: Ed Thompson (Idaho State)

1976–77 Big Sky men's basketball standings
| | Conf. | | | | Overall |
| Team | W | | L | PCT | W | | L | PCT |
|---|---|---|---|---|---|---|---|---|
| Idaho State † | 13 | – | 1 | .929 | 25 | – | 5 | .833 |
| Weber State | 11 | – | 3 | .786 | 20 | – | 8 | .714 |
| Gonzaga | 7 | – | 7 | .500 | 11 | – | 16 | .407 |
| Montana State | 6 | – | 8 | .429 | 12 | – | 14 | .462 |
| Northern Arizona | 5 | – | 9 | .357 | 12 | – | 15 | .444 |
| Boise State | 5 | – | 9 | .357 | 10 | – | 16 | .385 |
| Montana | 5 | – | 9 | .357 | 7 | – | 19 | .269 |
| Idaho | 3 | – | 11 | .214 | 5 | – | 21 | .192 |
† Conference tournament winner

The 1977 Big Sky Conference men's basketball tournament was held March 4–5 at the ISU Minidome at Idaho State University in Pocatello, Idaho.

Top-seeded Idaho State defeated Weber State in the championship game, 61–55, to clinch their first Big Sky men's basketball tournament.

The Bengals received an automatic bid to the 32-team NCAA tournament, hosted Long Beach State, and won. In Provo, Utah, they upset UCLA by a point, but lost to UNLV in the Elite Eight.

== Format ==
First played in 1976, the Big Sky tournament had the same format for its first eight editions. The regular season champion hosted and only the top four teams from the standings took part, with seeding based on regular season conference records.

Montana State and Gonzaga made their first appearances, not having qualified as a top-four team the previous year. It was Gonzaga's sole Big Sky tournament; they narrowly missed the next two and left for the WCAC in the summer of 1979.

== Bracket ==
Semifinals; Friday, March 4
1 | Idaho State | 93
4 | Montana State | 77
3 | Gonzaga | 68
2 | Weber State | 69

Championship; Saturday, March 5
1 | Idaho State | 61
2 | Weber State | 55
