= 1975–76 Colorado State Rams men's basketball team =

American college basketball season

1975–76 Colorado State Rams men's basketball
- Conference: Western Athletic Conference
- Record: 10–16 (6–8 WAC)
- Head coach: Jim Williams (21st season)
- Home arena: Moby Arena

1975–76 WAC men's basketball standings
	Conf.				Overall
Team	W		L	PCT	W		L	PCT
No. 15 Arizona	11	–	3	.786	24	–	9	.727
UTEP	9	–	5	.643	19	–	7	.731
Utah	9	–	5	.643	19	–	8	.704
New Mexico	8	–	6	.571	16	–	11	.593
BYU	6	–	8	.429	12	–	14	.462
Colorado State	6	–	8	.429	10	–	14	.417
Arizona State	5	–	9	.357	16	–	11	.593
Wyoming	2	–	12	.143	10	–	17	.370
Rankings from AP Poll

The 1975–76 Colorado State Rams men's basketball team represented the Colorado State University as a member of the Western Athletic Conference during the 1975–76 men's basketball season. The Rams finished the regular season with a record of 10–16, 6–8.

== Schedule ==
Date time, TV	Rank^{#}	Opponent^{#}	Result	Record	Site city, state
November 29*		Portland State	W 98–90	1–0	Moby Arena; Fort Collins, Colorado
December 5*		Cal State Hayward	W 99–81	2–0	Moby Arena; Fort Collins, Colorado
December 6*		Denver	W 92–81	3–0	Moby Arena; Fort Collins, Colorado
December 13*		Air Force	L 70–71	3–1	Moby Arena; Fort Collins, Colorado
December 18*		vs. Fresno State	W 73–70 ^{OT}	4–1	
December 20*		at Utah State	L 81–87	4–2	Dee Glen Smith Spectrum; Logan, Utah
December 27*		vs. Texas Tech	L 55–59	4–3	
December 29*		vs. Oregon	L 66–70	4–4	
December 30*		Florida State	L 54–84	4–5	Moby Arena; Fort Collins, Colorado
January 9		New Mexico	L 71–80	4–6 (0–1)	Moby Arena; Fort Collins, Colorado
January 10		UTEP	W 63–62	5–6 (1–1)	Moby Arena; Fort Collins, Colorado
January 14*		Utah State	L 62–72	5–7 (1–1)	Moby Arena; Fort Collins, Colorado
January 16*		at Denver	L 70–71	5–8 (1–1)	UD Field House; Denver, Colorado
January 17*		at Montana	L 57–69	5–9 (1–1)	Adams Center/Dahlberg Arena
January 24		at Wyoming	W 51–41	6–9 (2–1)	Laramie, Wyoming
January 30		at Arizona	L 76–94	6–10 (2–2)	Tucson, Arizona
January 31		at Arizona State	L 79–98	6–11 (2–3)	Temple, Arizona
February 6		Utah	L 75–82	6–12 (2–4)	Moby Arena; Fort Collins, Colorado
February 7		BYU	W 93–84	7–12 (3–4)	Moby Arena; Fort Collins, Colorado
February 13		at UTEP	L 64–82	7–13 (3–5)	El Paso, Texas
February 14		at New Mexico	L 75–84	7–14 (3–6)	Albuquerque, NM
February 21		Wyoming	W 61–57	8–14 (4–6)	Moby Arena; Fort Collins, Colorado
February 27		Arizona State	W 96–76	9–14 (5–6)	Moby Arena; Fort Collins, Colorado
February 28		Arizona	L 72–78	9–15 (5–7)	Moby Arena; Fort Collins, Colorado
March 5		at BYU	W 85–81	10–15 (6–7)	Marriott Center
March 6		at Utah	L 77–88	10–16 (6–8)	Jon M. Huntsman Center; Salt Lake City, Utah
*Non-conference game. ^{#}Rankings from AP Poll. (#) Tournament seedings in parentheses.
