= Herman Harris =

American basketball player

Personal information
- Born: c. December 1953 (age 72) Chester, Pennsylvania, U.S.
- Listed height: 6 ft 5 in (1.96 m)
- Listed weight: 200 lb (91 kg)

Career information
- High school: Chester (Chester, Pennsylvania)
- College: Arizona (1973–1977)
- NBA draft: 1977: 2nd round, 43rd overall pick
- Drafted by: Philadelphia 76ers
- Position: Guard

Career history
- 1977–1978: Anchorage Northern Knights
- 1978–1979: Montana Sky
- 1979–1980: SSV Hagen

Career highlights
- First-team All-WAC (1977); Fourth-team Parade All-American (1973)
- Stats at Basketball Reference

Herman B. Harris (born c. December 1953) is an American former professional basketball player.

== Playing career ==
Harris played basketball at Chester High School in his hometown of Chester, Pennsylvania. He was lightly recruited despite being one of the leading prospects of his college recruiting class, which Harris attributed to scouts avoiding the city of Chester and its high crime rate. Harris impressed a scout from the University of Arizona in 1972 by being able to dunk while in a cast for his broken left foot, which led to a basketball scholarship offer from the university. He was named a Parade All-American during his high school senior year in 1973.

Harris began his career with the Arizona Wildcats as a reserve player. He had a breakthrough year during his senior season in 1976–77 when he was named a member of the first-team in the Western Athletic Conference (WAC). Harris scored a career-high in points with 35 against the Utah Utes on January 20, 1977, then tied his record when he scored the same amount against the BYU Cougars two days later.

Harris was selected as the 43rd overall pick in the 1977 NBA draft by the Philadelphia 76ers but he never played in the National Basketball Association (NBA). He began his career with the Anchorage Northern Knights of the Eastern Basketball Association in the 1977–78 season. Harris played with the Montana Sky of the Western Basketball Association (WBA) during the league's only season in 1978–79. In 1979–80, he played for SSV Hagen of the Bundesliga in Germany.

== Later life ==
Harris spent 14 years in the United States Army and worked for 20 years at the Pima County Courthouse in Tucson, Arizona. He elected to return to the University of Arizona in 2011 to finish his degree, which he had not completed when he left for his NBA attempt. Harris received his diploma in 2017.

== Career statistics ==
Legend
GP	Games played	GS	Games started	MPG	Minutes per game
FG%	Field goal percentage	3P%	3-point field goal percentage	FT%	Free throw percentage
RPG	Rebounds per game	APG	Assists per game	SPG	Steals per game
BPG	Blocks per game	PPG	Points per game	**Bold**	Career high

=== College ===
Year	Team	GP	GS	MPG	FG%	3P%	FT%	RPG	APG	SPG	BPG	PPG
1973–74	Arizona	21	–	–	**.480**	.500	–	3.8	–	–	–	7.6
1974–75	Arizona	13	–	–	.468	.700	–	3.9	–	–	–	8.4
1975–76	Arizona	**32**	–	–	.453	.524	–	3.8	–	–	–	10.8
1976–77	Arizona	27	–	**33.9**	.461	**.760**	–	**4.0**	**2.8**	**1.7**	**.2**	**20.1**
Career		93	–	33.9	.461	.659	–	3.8	2.8	1.7	.2	12.5
