= 1976–77 Boise State Broncos men's basketball team =

American college basketball season

1976–77 Boise State Broncos men's basketball
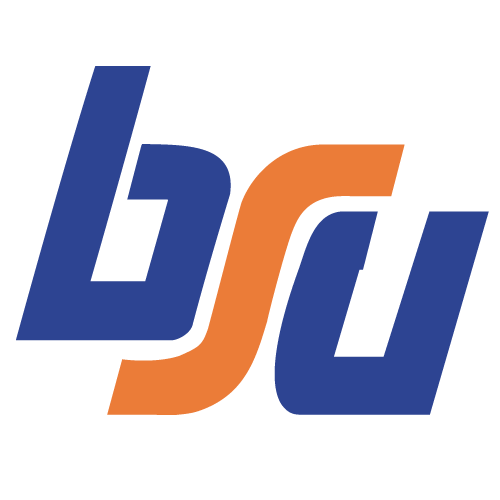
- Conference: Big Sky Conference
- Record: 10–16 (5–9 Big Sky)
- Head coach: Bus Connor (4th season)
- Home arena: Bronco Gymnasium

1976–77 Big Sky men's basketball standings
	Conf.				Overall
Team	W		L	PCT	W		L	PCT
Idaho State †	13	–	1	.929	25	–	5	.833
Weber State	11	–	3	.786	20	–	8	.714
Gonzaga	7	–	7	.500	11	–	16	.407
Montana State	6	–	8	.429	12	–	14	.462
Northern Arizona	5	–	9	.357	12	–	15	.444
Boise State	5	–	9	.357	10	–	16	.385
Montana	5	–	9	.357	7	–	19	.269
Idaho	3	–	11	.214	5	–	21	.192
† Conference tournament winner

The 1976–77 Boise State Broncos men's basketball team represented Boise State University during the 1976–77 NCAA Division I men's basketball season. The Broncos were led by fourth-year head coach Bus Connor and played their home games on campus at Bronco Gymnasium in Boise, Idaho.

They finished the regular season at 10–16 overall, with a 5–9 record in the Big Sky Conference, tied for fifth in the standings.

No Broncos were named to the all-conference team; junior guard Steve Connor was on the second team, and forward Danny Jones was honorable mention.
