= 1976–77 Idaho State Bengals men's basketball team =

American college basketball season

1976–77 Idaho State Bengals men's basketball
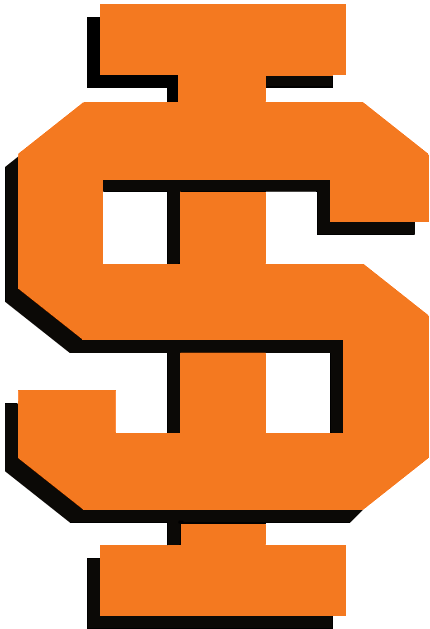

Big Sky tournament champions Big Sky Season Champions

NCAA tournament, Elite Eight
- Conference: Big Sky Conference
- Record: 25–5 (13–1 Big Sky)
- Head coach: Jim Killingsworth (6th season)
- MVP: Steve Hayes
- Home arena: ISU Minidome

1976–77 Big Sky men's basketball standings
	Conf.				Overall
Team	W		L	PCT	W		L	PCT
Idaho State †	13	–	1	.929	25	–	5	.833
Weber State	11	–	3	.786	20	–	8	.714
Gonzaga	7	–	7	.500	11	–	16	.407
Montana State	6	–	8	.429	12	–	14	.462
Northern Arizona	5	–	9	.357	12	–	15	.444
Boise State	5	–	9	.357	10	–	16	.385
Montana	5	–	9	.357	7	–	19	.269
Idaho	3	–	11	.214	5	–	21	.192
† Conference tournament winner

The 1976–77 Idaho State Bengals men's basketball team represented Idaho State University during the 1976–77 NCAA Division I men's basketball season. The Bengals were led by sixth-year head coach Jim Killingsworth and played their home games on campus at the ISU Minidome in Pocatello. Led by seven-foot (2.13 m) senior center Steve Hayes, they finished the regular season at 21–4 overall, with a 13–1 record in the Big Sky Conference.

As regular season champions, Idaho State hosted and won the second edition of the four-team conference tournament; the 32-team NCAA tournament started on their home floor with a victory over Long Beach State. At Provo, Utah, the Bengals drew national attention with their one-point upset of longtime power UCLA in the Sweet Sixteen. After UCLA scored to draw within one, freshman reserve guard Ernie Wheeler was quickly fouled in the backcourt with eight seconds remaining; he made both to go up by three. UCLA scored again with a second left, but time ran out after ISU successfully got the ball inbounds. Wheeler had earlier hit both free throws with 37 seconds remaining; the Bengals made nine of ten free throws in the final two minutes. This was the first time since 1963 that UCLA made the tournament but failed to get to the Final Four, which included the previous ten.

In the Elite Eight game (regional final) against UNLV, ISU led by a point at halftime, but lost by seventeen and ended the season at 25–5.

For the third consecutive year, Hayes was named to the all-conference team, joined by senior guard Ed Thompson; junior forward Jeff Cook and senior forward Greg Griffin were on the second team.

The Bengals were the fourth (of five) Big Sky teams to advance to the Sweet Sixteen; they remain the only Elite Eight team in conference history, and the only one to post consecutive wins in a given NCAA tournament.

After the season in late March, Killingsworth departed for Oklahoma State University of the Big Eight Conference.

== Roster ==
1976–77 Idaho State Bengals men's basketball team
Players
Coaches

Pos.	#	Name	Height	Weight	Year	Previous school	Hometown
G	21	Scott Goold	6 ft 5 in (1.96 m)	175 lb (79 kg)	So	Highland HS	Pocatello, ID
G	14	Ed Thompson	6 ft 3 in (1.91 m)	180 lb (82 kg)	Sr	Santa Barbara CC	Santa Barbara, CA
F	30	Greg Griffin	6 ft 7 in (2.01 m)	185 lb (84 kg)	Sr	Pasadena CC	Cleveland, OH
F	32	Jeff Cook	6 ft 10 in (2.08 m)	215 lb (98 kg)	Jr	Edgewood HS	West Covina, CA
C	33	Steve Hayes	7 ft 0 in (2.13 m)	235 lb (107 kg)	Sr	Aberdeen HS	Aberdeen, ID
F	22	Brand Robinson	6 ft 5 in (1.96 m)	185 lb (84 kg)	So	Manhattan HS	Manhattan, MT
G	12	Ernie Wheeler	6 ft 2 in (1.88 m)	160 lb (73 kg)	Fr	San Luis Obispo HS	San Luis Obispo, CA
F	15	Brian Bemis	6 ft 5 in (1.96 m)	175 lb (79 kg)	Jr	Coeur d'Alene HS	Coeur d'Alene, ID
F	20	Paul Wilson	6 ft 5 in (1.96 m)	220 lb (100 kg)	Fr	Fontana HS	Fontana, CA
C	35	Stan Klos	6 ft 7 in (2.01 m)	200 lb (91 kg)	Sr	St. Peters (NJ)	Old Bridge, NJ
F	31	Gene Bowen	6 ft 7 in (2.01 m)	200 lb (91 kg)	Jr	Southern Idaho	Lafayette, IN
G	10	Kelly Gardner	6 ft 0 in (1.83 m)	160 lb (73 kg)	Fr	Provo HS	Provo, UT
F	34	Mark McQuaid	6 ft 5 in (1.96 m)	190 lb (86 kg)	Fr	Chaffey HS	Ontario, CA

Head coach

- Jim Killingsworth
  (Northeastern St. (OK))

Assistant coach(es)

- Charlie Fenske
  (Wisconsin-Stout)

Legend

- (C) Team captain
- (S) Suspended
- (I) Ineligible
- (W) Walk-on
- Injured
- Current redshirt

Roster

== Postseason results ==
Date time, TV	Rank^{#}	Opponent^{#}	Result	Record	Site (attendance) city, state
Big Sky tournament
Fri, March 4; 9:00 pm	(1)	(4) Montana State; Semifinal	W 93–77	22–4	ISU Minidome (4,427); Pocatello, Idaho
Sat, March 5; 8:00 pm	(1)	(2) Weber State; Final	W 61–55	23–4	ISU Minidome (9,300); Pocatello, Idaho
NCAA tournament
Sat, March 12*; 4:37 pm		vs. Long Beach State; First round	W 83–72	24–4	ISU Minidome (10,897); Pocatello, Idaho
Thu, March 17*; 9:15 pm, NBC		vs. No. 2 UCLA; Sweet Sixteen	W 76–75	25–4	Marriott Center (21,639); Provo, Utah
Sat, March 19*; 2:15 pm, NBC		vs. No. 4 UNLV; Elite Eight	L 90–107	25–5	Marriott Center (19,298); Provo, Utah
*Non-conference game. ^{#}Rankings from AP poll. (#) Tournament seedings in parentheses. All times are in Mountain time.
