= 1976–77 Arizona Wildcats men's basketball team =

American college basketball season

1976–77 Arizona Wildcats men's basketball

NCAA tournament
- Conference: Western Athletic Conference
- Record: 21–6 (11–4 WAC)
- Head coach: Fred Snowden (5th season)
- Assistant coaches: Ken Maxey (4th season); Dave Toney (2nd season); Steve Kanner (2nd season)
- Home arena: McKale Center

1976–77 WAC men's basketball standings
	Conf.				Overall
Team	W		L	PCT	W		L	PCT
No. 14 Utah	11	–	3	.786	22	–	7	.759
Arizona	11	–	4	.733	21	–	6	.778
New Mexico	8	–	6	.571	19	–	11	.633
Wyoming	8	–	6	.571	17	–	10	.630
Colorado State	6	–	8	.429	13	–	12	.520
Arizona State	6	–	9	.400	15	–	13	.536
BYU	4	–	10	.286	12	–	15	.444
UTEP	3	–	11	.214	11	–	15	.423
Rankings from AP Poll

The 1976–77 Arizona Wildcats men's basketball team represented the University of Arizona in the 1976–77 NCAA Division I men's basketball season. Coached by fifth-year head coach Fred Snowden and led by senior center Bob Elliott, the Wildcats made their second consecutive NCAA tournament appearance (after a drought of 25 seasons), but were upset in the opening round by Southern Illinois. The Wildcats played their home games at the McKale Center in Tucson, Arizona competing as members of the Western Athletic Conference.

== Previous season ==
The Wildcats finished the 1975–76 season 24–9 overall, 11–3 in WAC play to finish atop the conference, a three win improvement from the season before. They finished the season ranked No. 15, reached the NCAA tournament for the first time in 25 years, advancing to the Elite Eight.

== Roster ==
1976–77 Arizona Wildcats men's basketball team
Players
Coaches

Pos.	#	Name	Height	Weight	Year	Previous school	Hometown
G	00	Gilbert Myles	6 ft 2 in (1.88 m)	175 lb (79 kg)	Jr	Edison HS	Fresno, California
G	12	Gary Harrison	6 ft 2 in (1.88 m)	180 lb (82 kg)	Sr	Willow Run HS	Ypsilanti, Michigan
G	14	Tom Ehlmann	6 ft 3 in (1.91 m)	170 lb (77 kg)	Jr	St. Charles HS	St. Charles, Missouri
G/F	21	Len Gordy	6 ft 5 in (1.96 m)	180 lb (82 kg)	Sr	Chester HS	Chester, Pennsylvania
F	22	Tim Marshall	6 ft 4 in (1.93 m)	180 lb (82 kg)	Fr	Central HS	Pontiac, Michigan
G	23	Greg Lloyd	6 ft 2 in (1.88 m)	165 lb (75 kg)	So	Eastern HS	Lansing, Michigan
G/F	24	Herman Harris	6 ft 5 in (1.96 m)	200 lb (91 kg)	Sr	Chester HS	Chester, Pennsylvania
G/F	25	Ron Fuller	6 ft 4 in (1.93 m)	195 lb (88 kg)	So	Southwest HS	Atlanta, Georgia
F	32	Larry Demic	6 ft 8 in (2.03 m)	225 lb (102 kg)	So	Westside HS	Gary, Indiana
C	33	Brian Jung	7 ft 0 in (2.13 m)	225 lb (102 kg)	So	Canyon del Oro HS	Tucson, Arizona
F	34	Mitch Jones	6 ft 7 in (2.01 m)	210 lb (95 kg)	Jr	East HS	Rochester, New York
C	41	Bob Aleksa	6 ft 10 in (2.08 m)	220 lb (100 kg)	Sr	East HS	Aurora, Illinois
F	42	Jay Geldmacher	6 ft 8 in (2.03 m)	210 lb (95 kg)	Sr	Elgin HS	Elgin, Illinois
C	44	Jerome Gladney	6 ft 8 in (2.03 m)	225 lb (102 kg)	Sr	King HS	Detroit, Michigan
F	52	Phil Taylor	6 ft 8 in (2.03 m)	225 lb (102 kg)	Jr	Manual HS	Denver, Colorado
F/C	55	Bob Elliott	6 ft 10 in (2.08 m)	225 lb (102 kg)	Sr	Pioneer HS	Ann Arbor, Michigan

Head coach

- Fred Snowden (Wayne State (MI))

Assistant coach(es)

- Ken Maxey (Michigan)
- Dave Toney (Purdue)
- Steve Kanner (Arizona)

Legend

- (C) Team captain
- (S) Suspended
- (I) Ineligible
- (W) Walk-on
- Injured
- Current redshirt

== Schedule and results ==
Date time, TV	Rank^{#}	Opponent^{#}	Result	Record	Site (attendance) city, state
Regular season
NCAA Tournament
Mar 12, 1977*	No. 20	vs. Southern Illinois; First round	L 77–81	21–6	Omaha Civic Auditorium; Omaha, Nebraska
*Non-conference game. ^{#}Rankings from AP Poll. (#) Tournament seedings in parentheses. All times are in Mountain.
