= 1976–77 Utah Utes men's basketball team =

American college basketball season

1976–77 Utah Utes men's basketball

WAC champions

NCAA tournament, Sweet Sixteen
- Conference: Western Athletic Conference

Ranking
- Coaches: No. 10
- AP: No. 14
- Record: 22–7 (11–3 WAC)
- Head coach: Jerry Pimm (3rd season)
- Home arena: Special Events Center

1976–77 WAC men's basketball standings
	Conf.				Overall
Team	W		L	PCT	W		L	PCT
No. 14 Utah	11	–	3	.786	22	–	7	.759
Arizona	11	–	4	.733	21	–	6	.778
New Mexico	8	–	6	.571	19	–	11	.633
Wyoming	8	–	6	.571	17	–	10	.630
Colorado State	6	–	8	.429	13	–	12	.520
Arizona State	6	–	9	.400	15	–	13	.536
BYU	4	–	10	.286	12	–	15	.444
UTEP	3	–	11	.214	11	–	15	.423
Rankings from AP Poll

The 1976–77 Utah Utes men's basketball team represented the University of Utah as a member of the Western Athletic Conference during the 1976–77 college basketball season. The team was led by head coach Jerry Pimm, and played their home games at the Special Events Center in Salt Lake City, Utah.

== Roster ==
1976–77 Utah Utes men's basketball team
Players	Coaches
Pos. / # / Name / Height / Weight / Year / Hometown; F / 5 / Jeff Judkins / 6 ft 6 in (1.98 m) / 235 lb (107 kg) / Jr / Salt Lake City, Utah	Head coach: Jerry Pimm (Southern California); Assistant coach(es) Legend: (C) Team captain; (S) Suspended; (I) Ineligible; (W) Walk-on; Injured; Current redshirt

== Schedule and results ==
Date time, TV	Rank^{#}	Opponent^{#}	Result	Record	Site city, state
Regular season
NCAA tournament
Mar 12, 1977*	No. 19	vs. St. John's	W 72–68	22–6	McKale Center; Tucson, Arizona
Mar 17, 1977*	No. 14	vs. No. 4 UNLV; West Regional Semifinal – Sweet Sixteen	L 83–88	22–7	Marriott Center (22,783); Provo, Utah
*Non-conference game. ^{#}Rankings from AP Poll. (#) Tournament seedings in parentheses. W=West.
