= Three-point play =

Basketball term

In basketball, a three-point play is usually achieved by scoring a two-point field goal, being fouled in the act of shooting, and scoring one point on the subsequent free throw. Before the three-point field goal was created in the 1960s for professional basketball and 1980s for collegiate basketball, it was the only way to score three points on a single possession. It is sometimes called an old-fashioned three-point play to distinguish from the later three-point shot. And one is also sometimes used to refer to the extra free throw after a two-point basket.

In FIBA-sanctioned 3-on-3 play (branded as 3x3), a "three-point play" or "four-point play" is possible only under very limited circumstances. In that form of the game, field goals taken inside the "three-point" arc are worth only 1 point, and field goals made from outside the arc are worth 2 points.

- A player fouled in the act of shooting a successful 2-point basket receives 1 free throw, as long as the defensive team has committed 6 or fewer team fouls in the game.
- Upon the 7th team foul in a game, the non-fouling team receives 2 free throws on all fouls by the defense—even after made baskets. This means that on fouls during a successful field goal attempt, a three-point play is possible after a made 1-point basket, and a four-point play after a made 2-point basket.

== See also ==
- Four-point play
