= 1976–77 Southern Illinois Salukis men's basketball team =

American college basketball season

1976–77 Southern Illinois Salukis men's basketball

MVC regular season and tournament champion

NCAA tournament, Sweet Sixteen
- Conference: Missouri Valley Conference
- Record: 22–7 (8–4 MVC)
- Head coach: Paul Lambert
- Home arena: SIU Arena

1976–77 Missouri Valley Conference men's basketball standings
| | Conf. | | | | Overall |
| Team | W | | L | PCT | W | | L | PCT |
|---|---|---|---|---|---|---|---|---|
| Southern Illinois † | 8 | – | 4 | .667 | 22 | – | 7 | .759 |
| New Mexico State | 8 | – | 4 | .667 | 17 | – | 10 | .630 |
| Wichita State | 7 | – | 5 | .583 | 18 | – | 10 | .643 |
| West Texas State | 7 | – | 5 | .583 | 17 | – | 13 | .567 |
| Drake | 5 | – | 7 | .417 | 10 | – | 17 | .370 |
| Bradley | 4 | – | 8 | .333 | 9 | – | 18 | .333 |
| Tulsa | 3 | – | 9 | .250 | 6 | – | 21 | .222 |
† 1977 MVC tournament winner Rankings from AP Poll

The 1976–77 Southern Illinois Salukis men's basketball team represented Southern Illinois University Carbondale during the 1976–77 NCAA Division I men's basketball season. The Salukis were led by eighth-year head coach Paul Lambert and played their home games at the SIU Arena in Carbondale, Illinois as members of the Missouri Valley Conference. They finished the season 22–7, 8–4 in MVC play to finish in first place. The Salukis won the MVC tournament to receive an automatic bid to the NCAA tournament – the first appearance in the Division I tournament in program history.

== Roster ==
1976–77 Southern Illinois Salukis men's basketball team
Players
Coaches

| Pos. | # | Name | Height | Weight | Year | Previous school | Hometown |
|---|---|---|---|---|---|---|---|
| C | 10 | Al Grant | 6 ft 9 in (2.06 m) | 217 lb (98 kg) | Fr | Cedartown | Cedartown, Georgia |
| G | 12 | Tom Harris | 6 ft 0 in (1.83 m) | 160 lb (73 kg) | Jr | Dunbar Vocational | Chicago, Illinois |
| G | 14 | Gary Fitzsimmons | 5 ft 10 in (1.78 m) | 168 lb (76 kg) | Jr | McClintock HS; Nebraska | Chamblee, Georgia |
| F | 25 | Richard Ford | 6 ft 5 in (1.96 m) | 180 lb (82 kg) | So | Parker | Birmingham, Alabama |
| F | 30 | Gary Wilson | 6 ft 6 in (1.98 m) | 200 lb (91 kg) | So | Carver | Columbus, Georgia |
| G | 31 | Mark Winter | — | 180 lb (82 kg) | So | Carmi | Carmi, Illinois |
| G | 32 | Milt Huggins | 6 ft 3 in (1.91 m) | 191 lb (87 kg) | So | Palmetto | Palmetto, Georgia |
| G | 34 | Mike Glenn | 6 ft 3 in (1.91 m) | 180 lb (82 kg) | Sr | Coosa | Rome, Georgia |
| G | 35 | Jerry Kellum | 6 ft 3 in (1.91 m) | 190 lb (86 kg) | Jr | Murphysboro; John A. Logan College | Murphysboro, Illinois |
| F | 40 | Corky Abrams | 6 ft 7 in (2.01 m) | 211 lb (96 kg) | Sr | Douglass | Atlanta, Georgia |
| G | 41 | Wayne Abrams | 6 ft 6 in (1.98 m) | 175 lb (79 kg) | Fr | Douglass | Atlanta, Georgia |
| F | 42 | Barry Smith | 6 ft 6 in (1.98 m) | 185 lb (84 kg) | Fr | Eldorado | Eldorado, Illinois |
| G/F | 43 | Al Williams | 6 ft 9 in (2.06 m) | 175 lb (79 kg) | So | Hamilton | Memphis, Tennessee |
| F/C | 44 | Dan Kieszkowski | 6 ft 7 in (2.01 m) | 205 lb (93 kg) | Fr | Rogers | Michigan City, Indiana |
| F/C | 54 | Mel Hughlett | 6 ft 8 in (2.03 m) | 226 lb (103 kg) | RS Sr | Carbondale; Vincennes; Southeastern Louisiana | Carbondale, Illinois |

Head coach

- Paul Lambert

Assistant coach(es)

- George Iubelt
- Herman Williams

Legend

- (C) Team captain
- (S) Suspended
- (I) Ineligible
- (W) Walk-on
- Injured
- Current redshirt

Roster

== Schedule and results ==
| Date time, TV | Rank^{#} | Opponent^{#} | Result | Record | Site (attendance) city, state |
Exhibition
| Nov 11, 1976*; 7:35 p.m. | | Brazilian National Team | W 87–59 | | SIU Arena; Carbondale, Illinois |
Regular season
| Nov 26, 1976*; 7:00 p.m. | | vs. No. 20 Missouri; Arch Classic | W 68–55 | 1–0 | |
| Nov 29, 1976*; 7:35 p.m. | | William Jewell | W 73–60 | 2–0 | SIU Arena; Carbondale, Illinois |
| Dec 4, 1976*; 7:35 p.m. | | UMKC | W 96–78 | 3–0 | SIU Arena; Carbondale, Illinois |
| Dec 6, 1976*; 7:35 p.m. | | Northeastern State | W 63–61 | 4–0 | SIU Arena; Carbondale, Illinois |
| Dec 8, 1976*; 7:35 p.m. | | Millikin | W 82–45 | 5–0 | SIU Arena; Carbondale, Illinois |
| Dec 10, 1976*; 8:00 p.m. | | at Pittsburgh; Pittsburgh Classic | W 72–67 | 6–0 | Fitzgerald Field House; Pittsburgh, Pennsylvania |
| Dec 11, 1976*; 8:00 p.m. | | vs. Hofstra; Pittsburgh Classic | L 66–67 | 6–1 | Fitzgerald Field House; Pittsburgh, Pennsylvania |
| Dec 15, 1976*; 7:35 p.m. | | Cal Poly | W 79–50 | 7–1 | SIU Arena; Carbondale, Illinois |
| Dec 20, 1976*; 7:00 p.m. | | at Georgia Southern | L 67–83 | 7–2 | Hanner Fieldhouse; Statesboro, Georgia |
| Jan 3, 1977*; 7:35 p.m. | | Benedictine (KS) | W 100–51 | 8–2 | SIU Arena; Carbondale, Illinois |
| Jan 8, 1977; 7:35 p.m. | | Bradley | L 58–65 | 8–3 (0–1) | SIU Arena; Carbondale, Illinois |
| Jan 13, 1977; 7:35 p.m. | | Wichita State | W 60–59 | 9–3 (1–1) | SIU Arena; Carbondale, Illinois |
| Jan 20, 1977; 7:30 p.m. | | at West Texas A&M | L 74–78 ^{OT} | 9–4 (1–2) | |
| Jan 22, 1977; 8:30 p.m. | | at New Mexico State | W 71–69 | 10–4 (2–2) | Pan American Center; Las Cruces, New Mexico |
| Jan 29, 1977; 7:35 p.m. | | Tulsa | W 85–51 | 11–4 (3–2) | SIU Arena; Carbondale, Illinois |
| Jan 31, 1977*; 8:00 p.m. | | at Saint Louis | W 76–73 | 12–4 | Kiel Auditorium; St. Louis, Missouri |
| Feb 5, 1977; 7:30 p.m. | | at Wichita State | L 90–91 ^{2OT} | 12–5 (3–3) | Charles Koch Arena; Wichita, Kansas |
| Feb 7, 1977*; 7:35 p.m. | | Roosevelt | W 95–58 | 13–5 | SIU Arena; Carbondale, Illinois |
| Feb 10, 1977; 7:35 p.m. | | West Texas A&M | W 76–58 | 14–5 (4–3) | SIU Arena; Carbondale, Illinois |
| Feb 12, 1977; 7:30 p.m. | | at Bradley | W 82–81 | 15–5 (5–3) | SIU Arena; Carbondale, Illinois |
| Feb 14, 1977*; 7:35 p.m. | | Evansville | W 79–67 | 16–5 | SIU Arena; Carbondale, Illinois |
| Feb 17, 1977; 7:35 p.m. | | New Mexico State | W 93–64 | 17–5 (6–3) | SIU Arena; Carbondale, Illinois |
| Feb 19, 1977; 7:35 p.m. | | at Drake | W 66–57 | 18–5 (7–3) | Veterans Memorial Auditorium; Des Moines, Iowa |
| Feb 21, 1977*; 7:35 p.m. | | Evansville | W 72–60 | 19–5 | Roberts Municipal Stadium; Evansville, Indiana |
| Feb 24, 1977; 7:30 p.m. | | at Tulsa | L 91–99 ^{OT} | 19–6 (7–4) | Tulsa Convention Center; Tulsa, Oklahoma |
| Feb 26, 1977; 7:35 p.m. | | Drake | W 80–61 | 20–6 (8–4) | SIU Arena; Carbondale, Illinois |
Missouri Valley tournament
| Mar 5, 1977*; 8:00 p.m. | (1) | vs. (4) West Texas A&M; Championship game | W 82–69 | 21–6 | Levitt Arena; Wichita, Kansas |
NCAA tournament
| Mar 12, 1977*; 3:35 p.m. | | vs. No. 20 Arizona; First round | W 81–77 | 22–6 | Omaha Civic Auditorium; Omaha, Nebraska |
| Mar 17, 1977*; 9:35 p.m. | | vs. No. 9 Wake Forest; Midwest Regional Semifinal – Sweet Sixteen | L 81–86 | 22–7 | Myriad Convention Center; Oklahoma City, Oklahoma |
*Non-conference game. ^{#}Rankings from AP poll. (#) Tournament seedings in parentheses. MW=Midwest. All times are in Central Time.
