= 1976–77 Cincinnati Bearcats men's basketball team =

American college basketball season

1976–77 Cincinnati Bearcats men's basketball

Metro tournament champions

NCAA tournament, Round of 32
- Conference: Metro Conference (1975–1995)

Ranking
- Coaches: No. 12
- Record: 25-5 (4-2 Metro)
- Head coach: Gale Catlett
- Home arena: Riverfront Coliseum

1976–77 Metro Conference men's basketball standings
	Conf.				Overall
Team	W		L	PCT	W		L	PCT
No. 19 Louisville	6	–	1	.857	21	–	7	.750
Cincinnati †	4	–	2	.667	25	–	5	.833
Georgia Tech	3	–	3	.500	13	–	10	.565
Tulane	3	–	3	.500	10	–	17	.370
Memphis State	3	–	4	.429	20	–	9	.690
Saint Louis	1	–	5	.167	7	–	19	.269
Florida State	0	–	2	.000	16	–	11	.593
† 1977 Metro Conference tournament winner Rankings from AP Poll

The 1976–77 Cincinnati Bearcats men's basketball team represented the University of Cincinnati in the 1976-77 NCAA Division I men's basketball season. The Bearcats were led by head coach Gale Catlett, as members of the Metro Conference. They finished the season 25–5, 4–2 in Metro play, finishing in second place. They defeated St. Louis, Memphis State, and Georgia Tech to win the Metro tournament for the second consecutive year, and received the conference's automatic bid to the NCAA tournament. They lost 66–51 to national champions Marquette.

== Previous season ==
The Bearcats finished the 1975–76 season 25–6, 2–1 in Metro play to win the regular season championship. As the number 1 seer, they defeated Georgia Tech and Memphis State to win the Metro tournament and received the conference's automatic bid to the NCAA tournament. They lost 79–78 to Notre Dame in the first round of the Midwest region.

== Roster ==
1976–77 Cincinnati Bearcats men's basketball team
Players
Coaches

Pos.	#	Name	Height	Weight	Year	Previous school	Hometown
PF	41	Bob Miller	6 ft 10 in (2.08 m)	230 lb (104 kg)	Jr	Central high School	Louisville, Kentucky
F	42	Pat Cummings	6 ft 9 in (2.06 m)	230 lb (104 kg)	RS Jr	Johnstown High School	Johnstown, Pennsylvania
G	44	Gary Yoder	6 ft 4 in (1.93 m)	185 lb (84 kg)	Sr	Westview High School	LaGrange County, Indiana
F		Brian Williams	6 ft 5 in (1.96 m)	—
F		Mike Jones	6 ft 5 in (1.96 m)	—	Jr
G		Steve Collier	6 ft 4 in (1.93 m)	—	Jr
G		Eddie Lee	6 ft 4 in (1.93 m)	180 lb (82 kg)	Fr		Queens, New York
C		Paul Fazekas	6 ft 8 in (2.03 m)	—	Sr
G		Keith Hemans	6 ft 3 in (1.91 m)	—	Sr
G		Mick Shoemaker	6 ft 0 in (1.83 m)	—
G		Mike Miller	6 ft 10 in (2.08 m)	—
F		Curtis Cabbell	6 ft 4 in (1.93 m)	—

Head coach

- Gale Catlett (Cincinnati)

Assistant coach(es)

Legend

- (C) Team captain
- (S) Suspended
- (I) Ineligible
- (W) Walk-on
- Injured
- Current redshirt

Roster
Last update: July 8, 2019

== Schedule and results ==
Date time, TV	Rank^{#}	Opponent^{#}	Result	Record	Site city, state
Regular Season
December 1, 1976*	No. 12	Wright State	W 120–52	1–0	UC Armory; Cincinnati, OH
December 4, 1976*		South Florida	W 103–69	2–0	Riverfront Coliseum; Cincinnati, OH
December 8, 1976*		at Bowling Green	W 67–63	3–0	Anderson Arena; Bowling Green, OH
December 15, 1976*		at Miami (OH)	W 79–68	4–0	Millett Hall; Oxford, OH
December 18, 1976		Saint Louis	W 86–53	5–0	Riverfront Coliseum; Cincinnati, OH
December 29, 1976*	No. 5	vs. South Carolina; Sugar Bowl Classic	W 79–62	6–0	Louisiana Superdome (7,000); New Orleans, LA
December 30, 1976*	No. 5	vs. Indiana; Sugar Bowl Classic Championship	W 52–43	7–0	Louisiana Superdome; New Orleans, LA
January 5, 1977*		Temple	W 61–46	8–0	Riverfront Coliseum; Cincinnati, OH
January 12, 1977*		Dayton	W 84–61	9–0	Riverfront Coliseum; Cincinnati, OH
January 16, 1977		at Saint Louis	W 54–52	10–0 (1–0)	Kiel Auditorium; St. Louis, MO
January 19, 1977	No. 2	at No. 12 Louisville	L 77-83	10–1 (1–1)	Freedom Hall; Louisville, KY
January 22, 1977		at Tulane	L 75-78	10–2 (1–2)	Avron B. Fogelman Arena; New Orleans, LA
January 26, 1977*		Wichita State	W 68-60	11–2	Riverfront Coliseum; Cincinnati, OH
January 29, 1977*		Duquesne	W 83-65	12–2	Riverfront Coliseum; Cincinnati, OH
January 31, 1977	No. 12	Memphis State	W 88-82	13–2 (2–2)	Riverfront Coliseum; Cincinnati, OH
February 2, 1977*		at Pittsburgh	L 64-65	13–3	Fitzgerald Field House; Pittsburgh, PA
February 6, 1977*	No. 12	No. 6 Marquette	W 63-62	14–3	Riverfront Coliseum (13,358); Cincinnati, OH
February 9, 1977*		at Eastern Kentucky	W 78-60	15–3	McBrayer Arena; Richmond, KY
February 12, 1977		Georgia Tech	W 84-73	16–3 (3–2)	Riverfront Coliseum; Cincinnati, OH
February 19, 1977*		at Rutgers	L 70-89	16–4	College Avenue Gymnasium; New Brunswick, NJ
February 26, 1977*		at Jacksonville	W 78-61	17–4	Jacksonville Memorial Coliseum; Jacksonville, FL
Metro Conference tournament
March 3, 1977	(2)	vs. (6) Saint Louis; Quarterfinals	W 76–68	18–4	Mid-South Coliseum; Memphis, TN
March 4, 1977	(2)	vs. (5) Memphis State; Semifinals	W 68–67	19–4	Mid-South Coliseum; Memphis, TN
March 5, 1977	(2)	vs. (3) Georgia Tech; Final	W 74–61	20–4	Mid-South Coliseum; Memphis, TN
NCAA Tournament
March 12, 1977*; 2:00 p.m., NBC	No. 11	vs. No. 16 Marquette; First Round	L 51–66	20–5	Myriad Convention Center (9,821); Oklahoma City, Oklahoma
*Non-conference game. ^{#}Rankings from AP poll. (#) Tournament seedings in parentheses. All times are in Eastern Time.

== Rankings ==
Ranking movements Legend: ██ Increase in ranking ██ Decrease in ranking — = Not ranked
	Week																
Poll	Pre	1	2	3	4	5	6	7	8	9	10	11	12	13	14	15	Final
AP	—	12	8	6	4	5	2	3	2	12	12	12	10	14	14	11	—
