= 1976–77 UNLV Runnin' Rebels basketball team =

American college basketball season

1976–77 UNLV Runnin' Rebels basketball

NCAA Men's Division I Tournament, Final Four
- Conference: Independent

Ranking
- Coaches: No. 6
- AP: No. 4
- Record: 29–3
- Head coach: Jerry Tarkanian (4th season)
- Assistant coaches: Al Menendez; Ralph Readout; George McQuarn
- Home arena: Las Vegas Convention Center

1976–77 NCAA Division I men's basketball independents standings
	Conf.				Overall
Team	W		L	PCT	W		L	PCT
No. 4 UNLV		–		–	29	–	3	.906
Indiana State		–		–	25	–	3	.893
No. 6 Syracuse		–		–	26	–	4	.867
No. 12 Detroit		–		–	25	–	4	.862
Old Dominion		–		–	25	–	4	.862
Providence		–		–	24	–	5	.828
Holy Cross		–		–	23	–	6	.793
St. Bonaventure		–		–	23	–	6	.793
No. 7 Marquette		–		–	25	–	7	.781
North Texas State		–		–	21	–	6	.778
Illinois State		–		–	22	–	7	.759
No. 10 Notre Dame		–		–	22	–	7	.759
Creighton		–		–	21	–	7	.750
Oral Roberts		–		–	21	–	7	.750
Army		–		–	20	–	8	.714
St. John's		–		–	22	–	9	.710
Milwaukee		–		–	19	–	8	.704
Georgetown		–		–	19	–	9	.679
Virginia Tech		–		–	19	–	10	.655
James Madison		–		–	17	–	9	.654
Northwestern State		–		–	17	–	9	.654
Texas–Pan American		–		–	17	–	9	.654
Connecticut		–		–	17	–	10	.630
Seton Hall		–		–	18	–	11	.621
UNC Wilmington		–		–	16	–	10	.615
Portland State		–		–	16	–	10	.615
Iona		–		–	15	–	10	.600
Dayton		–		–	16	–	11	.593
Fairfield		–		–	16	–	11	.593
Georgia Southern		–		–	16	–	11	.593
Richmond		–		–	15	–	11	.577
Saint Francis (PA)		–		–	15	–	11	.577
DePaul		–		–	15	–	12	.556
Northeast Louisiana		–		–	15	–	12	.556
Stetson		–		–	15	–	12	.556
Utah State		–		–	15	–	12	.556
Colgate		–		–	13	–	11	.542
Navy		–		–	13	–	11	.542
Oklahoma City		–		–	14	–	12	.538
South Carolina		–		–	14	–	12	.538
Valparaiso		–		–	13	–	12	.520
Catholic		–		–	13	–	13	.500
Fairleigh Dickinson		–		–	13	–	13	.500
Loyola (IL)		–		–	13	–	13	.500
Maine		–		–	13	–	13	.500
Niagara		–		–	13	–	13	.500
Rhode Island		–		–	13	–	13	.500
Saint Peter's		–		–	13	–	13	.500
VCU		–		–	13	–	13	.500
Butler		–		–	13	–	14	.481
Manhattan		–		–	13	–	14	.481
New Hampshire		–		–	12	–	14	.462
Northeastern		–		–	12	–	14	.462
St. Francis (NY)		–		–	12	–	14	.462
Air Force		–		–	12	–	15	.444
Denver		–		–	12	–	15	.444
Southern Mississippi		–		–	11	–	16	.407
Siena		–		–	9	–	15	.375
Cleveland State		–		–	10	–	17	.370
Xavier		–		–	10	–	17	.370
Centenary (LA)		–		–	11	–	19	.367
Long Island		–		–	9	–	16	.360
Hawaii		–		–	9	–	18	.333
Western Carolina		–		–	8	–	16	.333
Vermont		–		–	8	–	17	.320
Boston College		–		–	8	–	18	.308
Baptist		–		–	8	–	19	.296
Marshall		–		–	8	–	19	.296
Boston University		–		–	7	–	19	.269
Robert Morris		–		–	7	–	19	.269
Samford		–		–	7	–	19	.269
Mercer		–		–	6	–	19	.240
Hardin–Simmons		–		–	6	–	21	.222
Houston Baptist		–		–	6	–	23	.207
Buffalo		–		–	5	–	21	.192
Fordham		–		–	5	–	21	.192
Wagner		–		–	3	–	21	.125
Canisius		–		–	3	–	22	.120
Rankings from AP Poll

The 1976–77 UNLV Runnin' Rebels basketball team represented the University of Nevada Las Vegas in NCAA Division I men's competition in the 1976–77 season. The team was led by head coach Jerry Tarkanian and played its home games in the Las Vegas Convention Center. This season marked the school's first appearance in the Final Four. The Rebels finished with an overall record of 29–3 and were ranked No. 4 in the final AP poll.

This team, nicknamed the Hardway Eight, is credited with paving the way in establishing UNLV as a national contender from the late 1970s through the early 1990s.

== Roster ==
1976–77 UNLV Runnin' Rebels men's basketball team
Players
Coaches

Pos.	#	Name	Height	Weight	Year	Hometown
G	10	Robert Smith	5 ft 11 in (1.8 m)	165 lb (75 kg)	Sr	Los Angeles, California
F	11	Eddie Owens	6 ft 7 in (2.01 m)	210 lb (95 kg)	Sr	Houston, Texas
G	22	Tony Smith	—	—
G	23	Reggie Theus	6 ft 6 in (1.98 m)	185 lb (84 kg)	So	Inglewood, California
C	24	Lewis Brown	6 ft 11 in (2.11 m)	225 lb (102 kg)	Sr	Los Angeles, California
G/F	25	Glen Gondrezick	6 ft 6 in (1.98 m)	215 lb (98 kg)	Sr	Boulder, Colorado
G	40	Sam Smith	6 ft 4 in (1.93 m)	195 lb (88 kg)	Sr	Las Vegas, Nevada
F	42	Larry Moffett	6 ft 8 in (2.03 m)	205 lb (93 kg)	Sr	Gary, Indiana

Head coach

- Jerry Tarkanian (Fresno State)

Assistant coach(es)

- Ralph Readout (Ohio)

Legend

- (C) Team captain
- (S) Suspended
- (I) Ineligible
- (W) Walk-on
- Injured
- Current redshirt

Roster

== Schedule and results ==
Date time, TV	Rank^{#}	Opponent^{#}	Result	Record	Site (attendance) city, state
Regular season
Nov 26, 1976*	No. 7	at Nevada	W 102–87	1–0	Centennial Coliseum (6,274); Reno, Nevada
Dec 1, 1976*	No. 6	Oregon	W 78–67	2–0	Las Vegas Convention Center (6,257); Las Vegas, Nevada
Dec 4, 1976*	No. 6	Iowa State	W 115–80	3–0	Las Vegas Convention Center (6,257); Las Vegas, Nevada
Dec 7, 1976*	No. 4	at Utah	L 96–100	3–1	Jon M. Huntsman Center (12,230); Salt Lake City, Utah
Dec 11, 1976*	No. 12	at San Diego State	W 118–113	4–1	San Diego Sports Arena (5,221); San Diego, California
Dec 17, 1976*	No. 12	North Dakota State	W 112–81	5–1	Las Vegas Convention Center (6,257); Las Vegas, Nevada
Dec 18, 1976*	No. 12	Idaho	W 135–78	6–1	Las Vegas Convention Center (6,257); Las Vegas, Nevada
Dec 21, 1976*	No. 12	Murray State; Las Vegas Rebel Roundup	W 104–77	7–1	Las Vegas Convention Center (6,005); Las Vegas, Nevada
Dec 22, 1976*	No. 12	Oklahoma; Las Vegas Rebel Roundup	W 100–89	8–1	Las Vegas Convention Center (6,257); Las Vegas, Nevada
Dec 28, 1976*	No. 11	Eastern Michigan; Las Vegas Holiday Classic	W 109–85	9–1	Las Vegas Convention Center (6,257); Las Vegas, Nevada
Dec 29, 1976*	No. 11	Saint Mary's; Las Vegas Holiday Classic	W 104–81	10–1	Las Vegas Convention Center (6,257); Las Vegas, Nevada
Jan 3, 1977*	No. 11	Colorado	W 113–91	11–1	Las Vegas Convention Center (6,257); Las Vegas, Nevada
Jan 7, 1977*	No. 9	New Mexico	W 121–96	12–1	Las Vegas Convention Center (6,257); Las Vegas, Nevada
Jan 8, 1977*	No. 9	Cal State Northridge	W 112–72	13–1	Las Vegas Convention Center (6,257); Las Vegas, Nevada
Jan 11, 1977*	No. 8	Northern Arizona	W 132–90	14–1	Las Vegas Convention Center (6,257); Las Vegas, Nevada
Jan 21, 1977*	No. 7	UC Santa Barbara	W 113–69	15–1	Las Vegas Convention Center (6,257); Las Vegas, Nevada
Jan 22, 1977*	No. 7	Pepperdine	W 85–80	16–1	Las Vegas Convention Center (6,257); Las Vegas, Nevada
Feb 1, 1977*	No. 4	at Bradley	W 107–106	17–1	Robertson Memorial Field House (7,300); Peoria, Illinois
Feb 3, 1977*	No. 4	at Illinois State	L 84–88	17–2	Horton Field House (8,000); Normal, Illinois
Feb 5, 1977*	No. 4	vs. Rutgers	W 89–88	18–2	Spectrum (7,506); Philadelphia, Pennsylvania
Feb 10, 1977*	No. 10	Denver	W 106–84	19–2	Las Vegas Convention Center (6,257); Las Vegas, Nevada
Feb 12, 1977*	No. 10	No. 6 Louisville	W 99–96	20–2	Las Vegas Convention Center (6,457); Las Vegas, Nevada
Feb 17, 1977*	No. 6	Texas-Rio Grande Valley	W 135–106	21–2	Las Vegas Convention Center (6,257); Las Vegas, Nevada
Feb 19, 1977*	No. 6	Portland State	W 112–96	22–2	Las Vegas Convention Center (6,257); Las Vegas, Nevada
Feb 24, 1977*	No. 6	at Denver	W 99–82	23–2	DU Fieldhouse (2,316); Denver, Colorado
Mar 1, 1977*	No. 5	Hawaii	W 124–84	24–2	Las Vegas Convention Center (6,307); Las Vegas, Nevada
Mar 5, 1977*	No. 5	at Pepperdine	W 117–94	25–2	Firestone Fieldhouse (3,500); Malibu, California
NCAA Tournament
Mar 12, 1977*	No. 5	vs. No. 3 San Francisco; West Regional Quarterfinal	W 121–95	26–2	McKale Center (14,438); Tucson, Arizona
Mar 17, 1977*	No. 4	vs. No. 14 Utah; West Regional semifinal – Sweet Sixteen	W 88–83	27–2	Marriott Center (22,783); Provo, Utah
Mar 19, 1977*	No. 4	vs. Idaho State; West Regional final – Elite Eight	W 107–90	28–2	Marriott Center (22,783); Provo, Utah
Mar 26, 1977*	No. 4	vs. No. 5 North Carolina; National semifinal – Final Four	L 83–84	28–3	The Omni (16,086); Atlanta, Georgia
Mar 28, 1977*	No. 4	vs. No. 17 UNC Charlotte; National 3rd-place game	W 106–94	29–3	The Omni (16,086); Atlanta, Georgia
*Non-conference game. ^{#}Rankings from AP Poll. (#) Tournament seedings in parentheses. W=West.

== Rankings ==
Ranking movements Legend: ██ Increase in ranking ██ Decrease in ranking
	Week																
Poll	Pre	1	2	3	4	5	6	7	8	9	10	11	12	13	14	15	Final
AP	7	6	5	12	12	11	9	8	7	5	4	10	6	4	5	5	4
Coaches	7	7	4	11	11	9	9	7	6	5	3	8	7	4	6	6	Not released

== Team players drafted into the NBA ==
Round	Pick	Player	NBA club
2	26	Glen Gondrezick	New York Knicks
2	31	Eddie Owens	Kansas City Kings
2	34	Larry Moffett	Houston Rockets
3	48	Sam Smith	Atlanta Hawks
3	65	Robert Smith	Denver Nuggets
4	69	Lewis Brown	Milwaukee Bucks

== See also ==
- UNLV Runnin' Rebels basketball
- 1977 NCAA Division I men's basketball tournament
