= Four-point play =

Game situation in basketball

In basketball, a four-point play is the rare occasion when an offensive player shoots and makes a three-point field goal while simultaneously being fouled by a defensive player, resulting in a shooting foul and one free throw attempt, or a two-point field goal and is intentionally or flagrantly fouled on the shot and is awarded two free throws. If the player makes their free throws, they will have scored four points on a single possession. The short-lived American Basketball League first introduced the four-point play to the game of basketball, and it was later adopted by the American Basketball Association during its inaugural season. The National Basketball Association (NBA) introduced that rule in 1979; FIBA in 1984; the NCAA in 1986 (men only) and 1987 (women); the NHFS in 1987; and the WNBA in 1997.

Sam Smith of the Chicago Bulls completed the first four-point play in NBA history on October 21, 1979, in a game against the Milwaukee Bucks. Dale Ellis was the first player in NBA history to complete two four-point plays in the same game when he did so in a win against the Sacramento Kings on January 26, 1988.

Game 3 of the 1999 Eastern Conference Finals was decided by Larry Johnson's four-point play. With the New York Knicks trailing 88–91 and 5.7 seconds remaining, Johnson made the game-tying 3-pointer while drawing a controversial foul call against the Indiana Pacers' Antonio Davis. Johnson hit the subsequent free-throw to win the game, giving the 8th-seed Knicks a 2–1 lead in that series, which they won 4–2 (but lost to the San Antonio Spurs in the Finals).

On April 29, 2009, James Jones completed two four-point plays in a span of eleven seconds.

The Harlem Globetrotters also have a four-point field goal, with a line 30 feet from the basket as of December 2016. Previously, the Globetrotters also had a four-point circle, used since 2010. While uncommon in professional basketball, leagues such as the PBA and Big3 have adopted different forms of a 4-point line, where one field goal is worth four points. The NBA career leader in four-point plays is currently James Harden, who had 101 as of May 2026.

== See also ==
- Three-point play
