= 1975–76 Utah Utes men's basketball team =

American college basketball season

1975–76 Utah Utes men's basketball
- Conference: Western Athletic Conference
- Record: 19–8 (9–5 WAC)
- Head coach: Jerry Pimm
- Home arena: Jon M. Huntsman Center

1975–76 WAC men's basketball standings
	Conf.				Overall
Team	W		L	PCT	W		L	PCT
No. 15 Arizona	11	–	3	.786	24	–	9	.727
UTEP	9	–	5	.643	19	–	7	.731
Utah	9	–	5	.643	19	–	8	.704
New Mexico	8	–	6	.571	16	–	11	.593
BYU	6	–	8	.429	12	–	14	.462
Colorado State	6	–	8	.429	10	–	14	.417
Arizona State	5	–	9	.357	16	–	11	.593
Wyoming	2	–	12	.143	10	–	17	.370
Rankings from AP Poll

The 1975–76 Utah Utes men's basketball team represented the University of Utah as a member of the Western Athletic Conference during the 1975–76 men's basketball season.

== Schedule ==
Date time, TV	Rank^{#}	Opponent^{#}	Result	Record	Site city, state
November 28*		Idaho	W 99–79	1–0	Jon M. Huntsman Center; Salt Lake City, Utah
December 1*		Loyola Marymount	W 89–79	2–0	Jon M. Huntsman Center; Salt Lake City, Utah
December 6*		Utah State	L 64–71	2–1	Jon M. Huntsman Center; Salt Lake City, Utah
December 12*		Denver	W 107–84	3–1	Jon M. Huntsman Center; Salt Lake City, Utah
December 13*		San Diego State	W 98–89	4–1	Jon M. Huntsman Center; Salt Lake City, Utah
December 16*		at Weber State	L 87–88	4–2	Swenson Gym; Ogden, Utah
December 20*		St. Peters	W 100–82	5–2	Jon M. Huntsman Center; Salt Lake City, Utah
December 22*		UC-Irvine	W 90–55	6–2	Jon M. Huntsman Center; Salt Lake City, Utah
December 26*		at UNLV	L 90–107	6–3	Las Vegas Convention Center; Winchester, Nevada
December 29*		vs. Harvard	W 89–78	7–3	
December 30*		at Canisius	W 91–89	8–3	Buffalo Memorial Auditorium; Buffalo, NY
January 3*		Weber State	W 88–77	9–3	Jon M. Huntsman Center; Salt Lake City, Utah
January 8*		at Utah State	W 82–80	10–3	Dee Glen Smith Spectrum; Logan, Utah
January 16		at Arizona State	W 90–72	11–3 (1–0)	ASU Activity Center; Tempe, Arizona
January 17		at Arizona	L 77–87	11–4 (1–1)	McKale Center; Tucson, Arizona
January 24		at BYU	W 76–74	12–4 (2–1)	Marriott Center; Provo, Utah
January 30		UTEP	W 53–49	13–4 (3–1)	Jon M. Huntsman Center; Salt Lake City, Utah
January 31		New Mexico	W 34–32	14–4 (4–1)	Jon M. Huntsman Center; Salt Lake City, Utah
February 6		at Colorado State	W 82–75	15–4 (5–1)	Moby Arena; Fort Collins, Colorado
February 7		at Wyoming	W 87–69	16–4 (6–1)	War Memorial Fieldhouse; Laramie, Wyoming
February 13		Arizona	L 76–89	16–5 (6–2)	Jon M. Huntsman Center; Salt Lake City, Utah
February 14		Arizona State	W 87–83	17–5 (7–2)	Jon M. Huntsman Center; Salt Lake City, Utah
February 21		BYU	L 83–84	17–6 (7–3)	Jon M. Huntsman Center; Salt Lake City, Utah
February 26		at New Mexico	W 73–69	18–6 (8–3)	The Pit; Albuquerque, NM
February 27		at UTEP	L 71–81	18–7 (8–4)	Memorial Gymnasium; El Paso, Texas
March 5		Wyoming	L 61–64	18–8 (8–5)	Jon M. Huntsman Center; Salt Lake City, Utah
March 6		Colorado State	W 88–77	19–8 (8–5)	Jon M. Huntsman Center; Salt Lake City, Utah
*Non-conference game. ^{#}Rankings from AP Poll. (#) Tournament seedings in parentheses.
