= 1976–77 Idaho Vandals men's basketball team =

American college basketball season

1976–77 Idaho Vandals men's basketball
- Conference: Big Sky Conference
- Record: 5–21 (3–11 Big Sky)
- Head coach: Jim Jarvis (3rd season)
- Home arena: Kibbie Dome

1976–77 Big Sky men's basketball standings
	Conf.				Overall
Team	W		L	PCT	W		L	PCT
Idaho State †	13	–	1	.929	25	–	5	.833
Weber State	11	–	3	.786	20	–	8	.714
Gonzaga	7	–	7	.500	11	–	16	.407
Montana State	6	–	8	.429	12	–	14	.462
Northern Arizona	5	–	9	.357	12	–	15	.444
Boise State	5	–	9	.357	10	–	16	.385
Montana	5	–	9	.357	7	–	19	.269
Idaho	3	–	11	.214	5	–	21	.192
† Conference tournament winner

The 1976–77 Idaho Vandals men's basketball team represented the University of Idaho during the 1976–77 NCAA Division I men's basketball season. Members of the Big Sky Conference, the Vandals were led by third-year head coach Jim Jarvis and played their home games on campus at the Kibbie Dome in Moscow, Idaho. They were 5–21 overall and 3–11 in conference play.

No Vandals were named to the all-conference team; senior guard James Smith, Idaho's leading scorer, was honorable mention.
