= Wade Houston =

American basketball player-coach (born 1944)

Biographical details
- Born: October 9, 1944 (age 82)

Playing career
- 1963–1966: Louisville

Coaching career (HC unless noted)
- 1971–1973: Ahrens HS (KY)
- 1973–1976: Louisville Male HS (KY)
- 1976–1989: Louisville (assistant)
- 1989–1994: Tennessee

Head coaching record
- Overall: 65–90 (college)
- Tournaments: 2–2 (NIT)

Allan Wade Houston Sr. (born October 9, 1944) is a former basketball player and coach who is currently President of Dry Ice Blasting Technologies, a division of Houston-Johnson, Inc. In 1962, Houston became the first African American to sign a basketball scholarship at the University of Louisville, where he earned his Bachelor's and master's degrees. In 1970–71, Houston played and coached professional basketball in France, after which he became an assistant coach at Louisville, then head coach at the University of Tennessee.

== Personal life ==
Aside from his business interests, Houston is the founder of the Black Coaches and co-founder of the African American Business Alliance. He serves on the following boards: Old National Bank, The Rawlings Group, the University of Louisville Athletic Board, and the Kentucky Horse Racing Commission. Along with Junior Bridgeman, he founded the Houston-Bridgeman scholarship program at the University of Louisville. Houston also serves on the board of the Allan Houston Legacy Foundation, which was founded to foster healthy and productive relationships between fathers and sons, and mentors and mentees. He hosts an annual charity golf classic in Alcoa, Tennessee, to raise funds to benefit area high school seniors to pursue a college education. He also served as co-chair of Governor Steve Beshear's inauguration committee, and holds an honorary Doctorate degree from Spalding University.

Wade was profiled in Passing the Torch, a compilation of stories and experiences of Louisville, Kentucky business leaders. He is married to Alice Kean Houston, and they have three children: Allan, Lynn, and Natalie.

=== Athletics ===
Houston was an assistant coach under Denny Crum at the University of Louisville for 13 years until 1989, when he was named the head coach of the University of Tennessee. In accepting the job at Tennessee, he became the first African-American head coach in the SEC.

His son Allan played for him at Tennessee and later went on to the National Basketball Association for the Detroit Pistons and New York Knicks.

Houston is now a businessman in Louisville, Kentucky, owning and operating a trucking and transportation business.

== Head coaching record ==
=== College ===
Record table
Season	Team	Overall	Conference	Standing	Postseason
Tennessee Volunteers (Southeastern Conference) (1989–1994)
1989–90	Tennessee	16–14	10–8	T–4th	NIT Second Round
1990–91	Tennessee	12–22	3–15	T–9th	
1991–92	Tennessee	19–15	8–8	3rd (East)	NIT Second Round
1992–93	Tennessee	13–17	4–12	6th (East)	
1993–94	Tennessee	5–22	2–14	6th (East)	
Tennessee:		65–90	27–57		
Total:		65–90			
