= Paul Lambert (basketball) =

American basketball player and coach

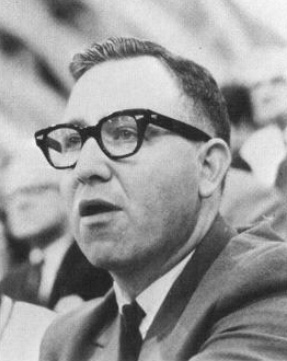
- Lambert in the 1967 Bronco

Biographical details
- Born: August 15, 1934; Kansas City, Missouri, U.S.
- Died: June 6, 1978 (aged 43); Columbus, Georgia, U.S.

Playing career
- 1952–1954: William Jewell

Coaching career (HC unless noted)

Basketball
- 1956–1959: Moberly HS (MO)
- 1959–1960: Boone HS (IA)
- 1960–1963: Drake (assistant)
- 1963–1966: Pittsburg State
- 1966–1970: Hardin–Simmons
- 1970–1978: Southern Illinois

Baseball
- 1961–1963: Drake

Head coaching record
- Overall: 227–160 (college basketball); 19–32–1 (college baseball)

Paul M. Lambert Jr. (August 15, 1934 – June 6, 1978) was an American college basketball coach.

Lambert played basketball at William Jewell College in Liberty, Missouri. After graduation, he coached high school basketball in Moberly, Missouri and Boone, Iowa, then obtained a job as an assistant and freshman coach (and head baseball coach) at Drake University. He got his first college head coaching position at Pittsburg State, where his teams went 44–29 in three seasons. From there, he followed Lou Henson at Hardin–Simmons, compiling a four-year record of 57–47. He then moved to Southern Illinois (SIU), where he led the team to an eight-year record of 126–84. His tenure was punctuated by leading the Salukis to their first Division I NCAA tournament appearance and win, behind star Mike Glenn. Lambert left SIU following the 1977–78 season to become head coach at Auburn.

Lambert died at age 43 in a Columbus, Georgia motel fire on June 6, 1978, before he was able to coach a game at Auburn.

== Head coaching record ==
=== College basketball ===
Record table
| Season | Team | Overall | Conference | Standing | Postseason |
|---|---|---|---|---|---|
Pittsburg State Gorillas (Central Intercollegiate Athletic Conference) (1963–1966)
| 1963–64 | Pittsburg State | 11–9 | 4–4 | | |
| 1964–65 | Pittsburg State | 15–10 | 6–2 | 1st | |
| 1965–66 | Pittsburg State | 18–10 | 7–1 | 1st | NAIA first round |
| Pittsburg State: | | 44–29 (.603) | 17–7 (.708) | | |
Hardin–Simmons Cowboys (Independent) (1966–1970)
| 1966–67 | Hardin–Simmons | 17–9 | | | |
| 1967–68 | Hardin–Simmons | 11–15 | | | |
| 1968–69 | Hardin–Simmons | 13–14 | | | |
| 1969–70 | Hardin–Simmons | 17–9 | | | |
| Hardin–Simmons: | | 57–47 (.548) | | | |
Southern Illinois Salukis (Midwestern Conference) (1970–1972)
| 1970–71 | Southern Illinois | 13–10 | 7–1 | 1st | |
| 1971–72 | Southern Illinois | 10–16 | 1–7 | 5th | |
Southern Illinois Salukis (NCAA University Division / Division I independent) (1972–1975)
| 1972–73 | Southern Illinois | 11–15 | | | |
| 1973–74 | Southern Illinois | 19–7 | | | |
| 1974–75 | Southern Illinois | 18–9 | | | NIT first round |
Southern Illinois Salukis (Missouri Valley Conference) (1975–1978)
| 1975–76 | Southern Illinois | 16–10 | 9–3 | 2nd | |
| 1976–77 | Southern Illinois | 22–7 | 8–4 | T–1st | NCAA Division I Sweet 16 |
| 1977–78 | Southern Illinois | 17–10 | 11–5 | 3rd | |
| Southern Illinois: | | 126–84 (.600) | 36–20 (.643) | | |
| Total: | | 227–160 (.587) | | | |
National champion Postseason invitational champion Conference regular season champion Conference regular season and conference tournament champion Division regular season champion Division regular season and conference tournament champion Conference tournament champion
