= Fred Snowden =

American collegiate basketball coach and businessman

Biographical details
- Born: c. 1936; Brewton, Alabama, U.S.
- Died: January 17, 1994; Washington, D.C., U.S.

Playing career
- 1954–1958: Wayne State (MI)

Coaching career (HC unless noted)
- 1967–1972: Michigan (assistant)
- 1972–1982: Arizona

Head coaching record
- Overall: 167–108

Accomplishments and honors

Championships
- WAC regular season (1976)

Awards
- WAC Coach of the Year (1973)

Frederick Snowden (c. 1936 – January 17, 1994) was an American businessman and men's basketball coach at the University of Arizona. Nicknamed "The Fox" for his cool demeanor, he was the first African-American head coach at a major university. Following his coaching career Snowden became an executive with Baskin-Robbins and the Food 4 Less foundation.

== Background ==
Snowden was born in Brewton, Alabama, the son of a sharecropper. At age 6 he moved to Detroit, Michigan with his mother and two brothers while his father remained in Alabama. He graduated from Detroit's Northwestern High School. Snowden met his wife, Maya, at Wayne State University and was married in 1962. The couple had two children: a son, Charles Anthony, and a daughter, Stacey Shannon.

Following college, Snowden worked as a basketball coach at his old high school. During his five-year tenure, the school's junior varsity team compiled a record of 90 wins to no losses while the varsity squad had a record of 87 wins and 7 losses. Snowden then worked as a sportscaster on local radio and television before becoming an assistant coach at the University of Michigan under Dave Strack and Johnny Orr.

== University of Arizona ==
In 1972, Snowden became the first African-American head basketball coach at a major university and the second black head coach at a Division I school, following Willie Williams, who was hired by the University of Arizona as head Track and Field coach in 1969 ], when he was hired at the University of Arizona in Tucson. The year before Snowden's arrival, Arizona was 6–20 (.231) and drew about 1,000 fans to each game. In his first year as head coach, the Wildcats were 16–12 (.571) and average attendance increased to 5,000; following the opening of McKale Center, up to 14,000 attended home games. Following his first season, he was also named Western Athletic Conference (WAC) Coach of the Year, Tucson's Man of the Year, and hosted two television shows. Under Snowden's tutelage, the Arizona program continued to succeed for several years, making the NCAA tournament twice, reaching their first ever regional final with the Elite Eight in 1976 (the Wildcats would not return to the round for twelve years).

Arizona's success under Snowden faded following their move to the Pacific-10 Conference in 1978, with his final three seasons resulting in losing records. In January 1982, he announced his resignation, effective at the end of the season. At the time of the announcement there were allegations that he had been involved with the improper use of a university slush fund, a charge that Snowden denied. A later NCAA investigation found no evidence Snowden had acted improperly. He was inducted into the University of Arizona hall of fame in 1988.

== Post-coaching career ==
Following the end of his coaching career, Snowden became a management consultant and operated his own business. In 1985 he was hired by Baskin-Robbins as vice president overseeing the company's National Metropolitan Franchise Expansion Program. Snowden later left Baskin-Robbins and became executive director of the Food 4 Less foundation.

Snowden's death came on January 17, 1994. While traveling to Washington, D.C. to attend a White House ceremony, he suffered a heart attack while at a convenience store and died at George Washington Hospital.

== Head coaching record ==
Record table
Season	Team	Overall	Conference	Standing	Postseason
Arizona Wildcats (Western Athletic Conference) (1972–1978)
1972–73	Arizona	16–10	9–5	T–2nd	
1973–74	Arizona	19–7	9–5	T–2nd	
1974–75	Arizona	22–7	9–5	T–2nd	NCIT Runner-up
1975–76	Arizona	24–9	11–3	1st	NCAA Division I Elite Eight
1976–77	Arizona	21–6	10–4	2nd	NCAA Division I First Round
1977–78	Arizona	15–11	6–8	T–4th	
Arizona Wildcats (Pacific-10 Conference) (1978–1982)
1978–79	Arizona	16–11	10–8	T–4th	
1979–80	Arizona	12–15	6–12	6th	
1980–81	Arizona	13–14	8–10	T-5th	
1981–82	Arizona	9–18	4–14	T–8th	
Arizona:		167–108	82–74		
Total:		167–108			
National champion Postseason invitational champion Conference regular season champion Conference regular season and conference tournament champion Division regular season champion Division regular season and conference tournament champion Conference tournament champion
