= 1976–77 UCLA Bruins men's basketball team =

American college basketball season

1976–77 UCLA Bruins men's basketball

Pac-8 champions

NCAA tournament, Sweet Sixteen
- Conference: Pacific-8

Ranking
- Coaches: No. 4
- AP: No. 2
- Record: 24–5 (11–3, 1st Pac-8)
- Head coach: Gene Bartow (2nd year)
- Assistant coaches: Larry Farmer; Lee Hunt
- Home arena: Pauley Pavilion

1976–77 Pacific-8 Conference men's basketball standings
	Conf.				Overall
Team	W		L	PCT	W		L	PCT
No. 2 UCLA	11	–	3	.786	24	–	5	.828
Oregon	9	–	5	.643	19	–	10	.655
Washington State	8	–	6	.571	19	–	8	.704
Washington	8	–	6	.571	17	–	10	.630
Oregon State	8	–	6	.571	16	–	13	.552
California	7	–	7	.500	12	–	15	.444
Stanford	3	–	11	.214	11	–	16	.407
USC	2	–	12	.143	6	–	20	.231
As of April 15, 1977; Rankings from AP Poll

The 1976–77 UCLA Bruins men's basketball team represented the University of California, Los Angeles in the 1976–77 NCAA Division I men's basketball season. In his second and final year as head coach, Gene Bartow and the Bruins began the season ranked fourth in the AP Poll and won the Pac-8 regular season with an 11–3 record. The Bruins were swept by Oregon, and also lost at Washington.

Ranked second and 23–4 overall, UCLA accepted a bid to the NCAA tournament; they defeated fourteenth-ranked Louisville in the first round in Pocatello, Idaho, and remained at second in the final poll. In the West Regional semifinals (Sweet Sixteen) at Provo, Utah, the Bruins were upset by a point by unranked Idaho State. Failing to make the Final Four broke a record streak of these appearances going back to 1966.

Senior forward Marques Johnson was a consensus All-American.

== Starting lineup ==
No.	Position	Player	Class
54	F	Marques Johnson	Sr.
34	F	David Greenwood	So.
32	C	Bret Vroman	Jr.
24	G	Roy Hamilton	So.
44	G	Jim Spillane	Sr.

== Roster ==
1976–77 UCLA Bruins men's basketball team
Players
Coaches

Pos.	#	Name	Height	Weight	Year	Hometown
F	54	Marques Johnson (C)	6 ft 7 in (2.01 m)	218 lb (99 kg)	Sr	Natchitoches, Louisiana
F	34	David Greenwood	6 ft 9 in (2.06 m)	222 lb (101 kg)	So	Lynwood, California
G	24	Roy Hamilton	6 ft 2 in (1.88 m)	180 lb (82 kg)	So	Los Angeles, California
G	44	Jim Spillane	5 ft 11 in (1.8 m)	—	Sr
C	32	Brett Vroman	7 ft 0 in (2.13 m)	220 lb (100 kg)	Jr	Hollywood, California
G	14	Brad Holland	6 ft 3 in (1.91 m)	217 lb (98 kg)	So	Billings, Montana
G	22	Raymond Townsend	6 ft 3 in (1.91 m)	175 lb (79 kg)	Jr	San Jose, California
C	31	Gig Sims	6 ft 9 in (2.06 m)	—	Fr
F	55	Kiki Vandeweghe	6 ft 7 in (2.01 m)	220 lb (100 kg)	Fr	Wiesbaden, West Germany
F	53	Wilbert Olinde	6 ft 7 in (2.01 m)	—	Sr
F	35	James Wilkes	6 ft 7 in (2.01 m)	195 lb (88 kg)	Fr	Nashville, Tennessee

Head coach

Gene Bartow

Assistant coach(es)

- Larry Farmer (UCLA)
- Lee Hunt

Legend

- (C) Team captain
- (S) Suspended
- (I) Ineligible
- (W) Walk-on
- Injured
- Current redshirt

Roster

== Schedule ==
Date time, TV	Rank^{#}	Opponent^{#}	Result	Record	Site city, state
Regular Season
November 26, 1976*	No. 4	San Diego State	W 74–64	1–0	Pauley Pavilion (12,062); Los Angeles, CA
November 27, 1976*	No. 4	No. 18 DePaul	W 76–69	2–0	Pauley Pavilion (12,131); Los Angeles, CA
December 01, 1976*	No. 3	Jacksonville	W 99–68	3–0	Pauley Pavilion (11,144); Los Angeles, CA
December 11, 1976*	No. 3	No. 7 Notre Dame	L 63–66	3–1	Pauley Pavilion (12,542); Los Angeles, CA
December 17, 1976*	No. 9	Rice	W 107–60	4–1	Pauley Pavilion (9,106); Los Angeles, CA
December 18, 1976*	No. 9	Tulsa	W 110–85	5–1	Pauley Pavilion (9,388); Los Angeles, CA
December 22, 1976*	No. 8	San Jose State	W 89–74	6–1	Pauley Pavilion (9,284); Los Angeles, CA
December 23, 1976*	No. 8	William & Mary	W 59–55	7–1	Pauley Pavilion (9,153); Los Angeles, CA
December 28, 1976*	No. 8	SMU	W 99–71	8–1	Pauley Pavilion (9,088); Los Angeles, CA
December 29, 1976*	No. 8	Utah State	W 88–68	9–1	Pauley Pavilion (11,657); Los Angeles, CA
January 02, 1977*	No. 8	Houston	W 96–83	10–1	Pauley Pavilion (9,302); Los Angeles, CA
January 07, 1977	No. 7	Oregon	L 60–61	10–2 (0–1)	Pauley Pavilion (12,497); Los Angeles, CA
January 08, 1977	No. 7	Oregon State	W 83–66	11–2 (1–1)	Pauley Pavilion (12,127); Los Angeles, CA
January 13, 1977	No. 12	at California	W 82–74	12–2 (2–1)	Harmon Gym (6,700); Berkeley, CA
January 15, 1977	No. 12	at Stanford	W 100–86	13–2 (3–1)	Maples Pavilion (8,000); Stanford, CA
January 23, 1977	No. 10	at Notre Dame	W 70–65	14–2	Athletic & Convocation Center (11,345); Notre Dame, IN
January 28, 1977	No. 8	USC	W 77–59	15–2 (4–1)	Pauley Pavilion (12,397); Los Angeles, CA
January 30, 1977	No. 8	vs. No. 7 Tennessee	W 103–89	16–2	Omni Coliseum (15,391); Atlanta, GA
February 03, 1977	No. 2	Washington	W 75–65	17–2 (5–1)	Pauley Pavilion (12,684); Los Angeles, CA
February 05, 1977	No. 2	Washington State	W 72–59	18–2 (6–1)	Pauley Pavilion (12,416); Los Angeles, CA
February 10, 1977	No. 2	at Washington State	W 65–62	19–2 (7–1)	WSU Performing Arts Coliseum (12,058); Pullman, WA
February 12, 1977	No. 2	at Washington	L 73–78	19–3 (7–2)	Hec Edmundson Pavilion (9,536); Seattle, WA
February 17, 1977	No. 3	at Oregon State	W 89–76	20–3 (8–2)	Gill Coliseum (10,501); Corvallis, OR
February 19, 1977	No. 3	at Oregon	L 55–65	20–4 (8–3)	McArthur Court (10,500); Eugene, OR
February 24, 1977	No. 5	Stanford	W 114–83	21–4 (9–3)	Pauley Pavilion (12,316); Los Angeles, CA
February 26, 1977	No. 5	California	W 91–69	22–4 (10–3)	Pauley Pavilion (12,512); Los Angeles, CA
March 05, 1977	No. 4	at USC	W 78–69	23–4 (11–3)	Los Angeles Memorial Sports Arena (9,300); Los Angeles, CA
NCAA Tournament
March 12, 1977*; 1:15 pm, NBC	No. 2	vs. No. 14 Louisville; Regional Quarterfinals	W 87–79	24–4	ISU Minidome (10,897); Pocatello, ID
March 17, 1977*; 8:15 pm, NBC	No. 2	vs. Idaho State; Regional semifinals	L 75–76	24–5	Marriott Center (21,639); Provo, UT
*Non-conference game. ^{#}Rankings from AP Poll. (#) Tournament seedings in parentheses. All times are in Pacific Time.
