= 1977 NCAA Division I basketball tournament =

Edition of USA college basketball tournament

- Season: 1976–77
- Teams: 32
- Finals site: The Omni, Atlanta, Georgia
- Champions: Marquette Warriors (1st title, 2nd title game, 2nd Final Four)
- Runner-up: North Carolina Tar Heels (4th title game, 7th Final Four)
- Semifinalists: UNLV Runnin' Rebels (1st Final Four); UNC Charlotte 49ers (1st Final Four)
- Winning coach: Al McGuire (1st title)
- MOP: Butch Lee (Marquette)
- Attendance: 241,610
- Top scorer: Cedric Maxwell (Charlotte) (123 points)

The 1977 NCAA Division I basketball tournament involved 32 American schools playing in single-elimination play to determine the National Champion of Men's NCAA Division I college basketball. The 39th annual edition of the tournament began on Saturday, March 12, 1977, and ended with the championship game on Monday, March 28, at The Omni in Atlanta. A total of 32 games were played, including a national third-place game. This was the final tournament in which teams were not seeded.

Marquette, coached by Al McGuire, won the national title with a 67–59 victory in the final game over North Carolina, coached by Dean Smith. Butch Lee of Marquette was named the tournament's Most Outstanding Player. Publicly announcing his retirement during the middle of the season, McGuire retired as head coach immediately after the game. UNLV and UNC Charlotte were third and fourth place, respectively. Marquette's seven losses were a record at the time for the most losses in a season by a national champion, exceeded four years later in 1981 by Indiana with nine.

== Schedule and venues ==
1977 sites for first round games
1977 Regionals (blue) and Final Four (red)

The following are the sites that were selected to host each round of the 1977 tournament:

First round

- March 12
  - East Region
    - The Palestra, Philadelphia, Pennsylvania (Hosts: University of Pennsylvania, Ivy League)
    - Reynolds Coliseum, Raleigh, North Carolina (Host: North Carolina State University)
  - Midwest Region
    - Lloyd Noble Center, Norman, Oklahoma (Host: University of Oklahoma)
    - Omaha Civic Auditorium, Omaha, Nebraska (Hosts: Creighton University, Missouri Valley Conference)
  - West Region
    - ASISU Minidome, Pocatello, Idaho (Hosts: Idaho State University, Big Sky Conference)
    - McKale Center, Tucson, Arizona (Host: University of Arizona)
- March 13
  - Mideast Region
    - LSU Assembly Center, Baton Rouge, Louisiana (Host: Louisiana State University)
    - Assembly Hall, Bloomington, Indiana (Host: Indiana University Bloomington)

Regional semifinals and finals (Sweet Sixteen and Elite Eight)

- March 17 and 19
  - East Regional, Cole Field House, College Park, Maryland (Host: University of Maryland, College Park)
  - Mideast Regional, Rupp Arena, Lexington, Kentucky (Host: University of Kentucky)
  - Midwest Regional, Myriad Convention Center, Oklahoma City, Oklahoma (Host: Oklahoma City University)
  - West Regional, Marriott Center, Provo, Utah (Host: Brigham Young University)

National semifinals, 3rd-place game, and championship (Final Four and championship)

- March 26 and 28
  - The Omni, Atlanta, Georgia (Host: University of Georgia)

== Teams ==
Region	Team	Coach	Conference	Finished	Final opponent	Score
East
East	Duquesne	John Cinicola	Eastern	Round of 32	VMI	L 73–66
East	Hofstra	Roger Gaeckler	East Coast	Round of 32	Notre Dame	L 90–83
East	Kentucky	Joe B. Hall	Southeastern	Regional Runner-up	North Carolina	L 79–72
East	North Carolina	Dean Smith	Atlantic Coast	Runner Up	Marquette	L 67–59
East	Notre Dame	Digger Phelps	Independent	Sweet Sixteen	North Carolina	L 79–77
East	Princeton	Pete Carril	Ivy League	Round of 32	Kentucky	L 72–58
East	Purdue	Fred Schaus	Big Ten	Round of 32	North Carolina	L 69–66
East	VMI	Charlie Schmaus	Southern	Sweet Sixteen	Kentucky	L 93–78
Mideast
Mideast	Central Michigan	Dick Parfitt	Mid-American	Round of 32	UNC Charlotte	L 91–86
Mideast	UNC Charlotte	Lee Rose	Sun Belt	Fourth Place	UNLV	L 106–94
Mideast	Detroit	Dick Vitale	Independent	Sweet Sixteen	Michigan	L 86–81
Mideast	Holy Cross	George Blaney	Independent	Round of 32	Michigan	L 92–81
Mideast	Michigan	Johnny Orr	Big Ten	Regional Runner-up	UNC Charlotte	L 75–68
Mideast	Middle Tennessee State	Jimmy Earle	Ohio Valley	Round of 32	Detroit	L 93–76
Mideast	Syracuse	Jim Boeheim	Independent	Sweet Sixteen	UNC Charlotte	L 81–59
Mideast	Tennessee	Ray Mears	Southeastern	Round of 32	Syracuse	L 93–88
Midwest
Midwest	Arizona	Fred Snowden	Western Athletic	Round of 32	Southern Illinois	L 81–77
Midwest	Arkansas	Eddie Sutton	Southwest	Round of 32	Wake Forest	L 86–80
Midwest	Cincinnati	Gale Catlett	Metropolitan	Round of 32	Marquette	L 66–51
Midwest	Kansas State	Jack Hartman	Big Eight	Sweet Sixteen	Marquette	L 67–66
Midwest	Marquette	Al McGuire	Independent	Champion	North Carolina	W 67–59
Midwest	Providence	Dave Gavitt	Independent	Round of 32	Kansas State	L 87–80
Midwest	Southern Illinois	Paul Lambert	Missouri Valley	Sweet Sixteen	Wake Forest	L 86–81
Midwest	Wake Forest	Carl Tacy	Atlantic Coast	Regional Runner-up	Marquette	L 82–68
West
West	Idaho State	Jim Killingsworth	Big Sky	Regional Runner-up	UNLV	L 107–90
West	Long Beach State	Dwight Jones	Pacific Coast	Round of 32	Idaho State	L 83–72
West	Louisville	Denny Crum	Metropolitan	Round of 32	UCLA	L 87–79
West	San Francisco	Bob Gaillard	West Coast	Round of 32	UNLV	L 121–95
West	St. John's	Lou Carnesecca	Independent	Round of 32	Utah	L 72–68
West	UCLA	Gene Bartow	Pacific-8	Sweet Sixteen	Idaho State	L 76–75
West	UNLV	Jerry Tarkanian	Independent	Third Place	UNC Charlotte	W 106–94
West	Utah	Jerry Pimm	Western Athletic	Sweet Sixteen	UNLV	L 83–88

== Bracket ==
* – Denotes overtime period

=== East region ===
Cole Field House – College Park, Maryland
First round games were played at Raleigh, North Carolina and Philadelphia, Pennsylvania on Saturday, March 12.

Quarterfinals
VMI	73
Duquesne	66
Kentucky	72
Princeton	58
Notre Dame	90
Hofstra	83
North Carolina	69
Purdue	66

Semifinals
VMI	78
Kentucky	93
Notre Dame	77
North Carolina	79

Finals
Kentucky	72
North Carolina	79

=== West region ===
Most of the excitement surrounding the Western Regional was the anticipated matchup between top-five-ranked teams UCLA and UNLV. Jerry Tarkanian had lost three times in the tournament to UCLA while he was at Long Beach State, including a heartbreaking 57–55 loss in the 1971 West Regional final in which Long Beach led by eleven in the second half. Many felt this UNLV team gave him the best opportunity to beat his longtime nemesis. But he never got the chance as UCLA was stunned in the regional semi final by unranked Idaho State of the Big Sky Conference. This was the first time since 1963 that UCLA made the tournament but failed to get to the Final Four. Down by a point at halftime, UNLV went on to easily beat Idaho State 107–90.

Marriott Center – Provo, Utah
First round games were played at Pocatello, Idaho and Tucson, Arizona on Saturday, March 12.

Quarterfinals
UCLA	87
Louisville	79
Idaho State	83
Long Beach State	72
Utah	72
St. John's	68
UNLV	121
San Francisco	95

Semifinals
UCLA	75
Idaho State	76
Utah	83
UNLV	88

Finals
Idaho State	90
UNLV	107

=== Mideast region ===
Rupp Arena – Lexington, Kentucky
First round games were played at Bloomington, Indiana and Baton Rouge, Louisiana on Sunday, March 13.

Quarterfinals
Michigan	92
Holy Cross	81
Detroit	93
Middle Tennessee State	76
UNC Charlotte	91
Central Michigan	86*
Syracuse	93
Tennessee	88*

Semifinals
Michigan	86
Detroit	81
UNC Charlotte	81
Syracuse	59

Finals
Michigan	68
UNC Charlotte	75

=== Midwest region ===
Myriad Convention Center – Oklahoma City, Oklahoma
First round games were played at Omaha, Nebraska and Norman, Oklahoma on Saturday, March 12.

Quarterfinals
Marquette	66
Cincinnati	51
Kansas State	87
Providence	80
Wake Forest	86
Arkansas	80
Southern Illinois	81
Arizona	77

Semifinals
Marquette	67
Kansas State	66
Wake Forest	86
Southern Illinois	81

Finals
Marquette	82
Wake Forest	68

=== Final Four ===
Omni Coliseum – Atlanta, Georgia

National semifinals Saturday, March 26
E	North Carolina	84
W	UNLV	83
ME	UNC Charlotte	49
MW	Marquette	51

National Championship Game; Monday, March 28
E	North Carolina	59
MW	Marquette	67
National third-place game
W	UNLV	106
ME	UNC Charlotte	94

== See also ==
- 1977 NCAA Division II basketball tournament
- 1977 NCAA Division III basketball tournament
- 1977 National Invitation Tournament
- 1977 NAIA Division I men's basketball tournament
- 1977 National Women's Invitation Tournament

== Notes ==
- All four regionals were played on Thursday and Saturday. The opening round the preceding weekend played twelve games on Saturday and four on Sunday.
- The tournament saw only two teams making their NCAA Tournament debut, the University of North Carolina at Charlotte and Southern Illinois University. Interestingly, both teams had hosted tournament games in their arenas before playing in the tournament; SIU Arena hosted first-round games in the 1969 tournament, and Charlotte Coliseum, which the 49ers had just moved to in 1976 after previously playing on campus at Belk Gymnasium, had hosted games seven previous years (including 1976) and would host five more times before the opening of the second Charlotte Coliseum in 1988.
- This tournament marked the most recent appearance of VMI; their 47-year drought is, as of 2024, the sixth-longest active drought in the NCAA and ninth all-time. Fellow 1977 tournament participant Duquesne, who also spent 47 years attempting to reach the tournament again, ended their drought in 2024.
- Prior to the 2023 NCAA Tournament, this marked the last time the six Division I college basketball-playing schools in the Philadelphia metropolitan area: Drexel, La Salle, Penn, St. Joseph's, Temple, and Villanova – were collectively shut out of the NCAA tournament. At least one of the teams had made the tournament the previous 18 years, and the city has only been shut out twelve of the 83 tournaments.

== Announcers ==
Dick Enberg, Curt Gowdy, and Billy Packer - Final Four at Atlanta, Georgia; For the Final Four, Dick Enberg and Billy Packer called the first game while Packer teamed with Curt Gowdy for the second game. For the Championship Game, Curt Gowdy called the play-by-play while Dick Enberg and Billy Packer did the color commentary.

- Dick Enberg and Billy Packer - First Round at Pocatello, Idaho (UCLA-Louisville); First Round at Baton Rouge, Louisiana (Syracuse-Tennessee); East Regional Semifinals at College Park, Maryland; West Regional Final at Provo, Utah
- Curt Gowdy and John Wooden - First Round at Bloomington, Indiana (Michigan-Holy Cross); Mideast Regional Semifinals at Lexington, Kentucky; East Regional Final at College Park, Maryland
- Jim Simpson and Tom Hawkins - First Round at Tucson, Arizona (UNLV-San Francisco); Mideast Regional Final at Lexington, Kentucky
- Jay Randolph and Gary Thompson - Midwest Regional Final at Oklahoma City, Oklahoma (Marquette-Wake Forest)
