= Aberdeen (disambiguation) =

Aberdeen is a city in Scotland.

Aberdeen may also refer to:

== Places ==
=== Africa ===
- Aberdeen, Sierra Leone
- Aberdeen, Eastern Cape, South Africa

=== Asia ===
==== Hong Kong ====
- Aberdeen, Hong Kong, an area and town on southwest Hong Kong Island
- Aberdeen Channel, a channel between Ap Lei Chau (Aberdeen Island) and Nam Long Shan on the Hong Kong Island in Hong Kong
- Aberdeen Country Park, a country park in Hong Kong Island
- Aberdeen floating village, at Aberdeen Harbour, containing approximately 600 junks, which house an estimated 6,000 people
- Aberdeen Harbour, a harbour between Aberdeen, Hong Kong and Ap Lei Chau (Aberdeen Island)
- Aberdeen Tunnel, a tunnel in Hong Kong Island
  - Aberdeen Tunnel Underground Laboratory, an underground particle physics laboratory in Hong Kong Island
- Ap Lei Chau or Aberdeen Island, an island of Hong Kong
- Aberdeen (Hong Kong constituency), a constituency of Southern District Council

==== India ====
- Aberdeen Bazaar, a shopping centre in Port Blair, South Andaman Island

==== Sri Lanka ====
- Aberdeen Falls, a waterfall in Sri Lanka

=== Australia ===
- Aberdeen, New South Wales
- Aberdeen, South Australia, one of the early townships that merged in 1940 to create the town of Burra
- Aberdeen, Tasmania, a suburb of the City of Devonport

=== Caribbean ===
- Aberdeen, Jamaica, a town in Saint Elizabeth, Jamaica

=== Europe ===
- Aberdeen (Parliament of Scotland constituency)
- Aberdeen (UK Parliament constituency) 1832–1885
- Aberdeen Burghs (UK Parliament constituency) 1801–1832
- Aberdeen Central (Scottish Parliament constituency)
- Aberdeen Central (UK Parliament constituency)
- Aberdeen Donside (Scottish Parliament constituency)
- County of Aberdeen, a historic county of Scotland whose county town was Aberdeen
- Old Aberdeen, a part of the city of Aberdeen in Scotland

=== North America ===
==== Canada ====
- Aberdeen, community in the township of Champlain, Prescott and Russell County, Ontario
- Aberdeen, Abbotsford, a neighbourhood in the City of Abbotsford, British Columbia
- Aberdeen Centre, a shopping mall in Richmond, British Columbia
- Aberdeen, Grey County, Ontario
- Aberdeen, Kamloops, an area in the City of Kamloops, British Columbia
- Aberdeen Lake (Nunavut), a lake in Kivalliq Region, Nunavut
- Aberdeen, Nova Scotia, part of the Municipality of Inverness County, Nova Scotia
- Aberdeen Parish, New Brunswick
- Rural Municipality of Aberdeen No. 373, Saskatchewan
  - Aberdeen, Saskatchewan
- Aberdeen Bay, a bay between southern Baffin Island and north-eastern Hector Island in the Nunavut territory
- Aberdeen Township, Quebec, until 1960 part of Sheen-Esher-Aberdeen-et-Malakoff, now part of Rapides-des-Joachims, Quebec
- Aberdeen River, a tributary of rivière aux Castors Noirs in Mauricie, Québec
- New Aberdeen, Nova Scotia

==== United States ====
- Aberdeen, Arkansas
- Aberdeen, Colorado
- Aberdeen, Florida
- Aberdeen, Georgia
- Aberdeen, Idaho
- Aberdeen, Ohio County, Indiana
- Aberdeen, Porter County, Indiana
- Aberdeen, Kentucky
- Aberdeen, Maryland
  - Aberdeen Proving Ground, a US Army facility located near Aberdeen, Maryland
- Aberdeen, Massachusetts, a neighborhood of Brighton, Boston
- Aberdeen, Mississippi
  - Aberdeen Lake (Mississippi), a lake in northeast Mississippi on the Tennessee-Tombigbee Waterway, close to Aberdeen, Mississippi
- Aberdeen Township, New Jersey
- Aberdeen, North Carolina
  - Aberdeen Historic District (Aberdeen, North Carolina)
- Aberdeen, Ohio
- Aberdeen, South Dakota
  - Aberdeen Historic District (Aberdeen, South Dakota)
- Aberdeen, Texas
- Aberdeen (Disputanta, Virginia)
- Aberdeen Gardens (Hampton, Virginia)
- Aberdeen, Washington
  - Aberdeen Gardens, Washington
- Aberdeen, West Virginia

=== Other places ===
- New Aberdeen (disambiguation)
- Aberdeen City Council, the local authority body of the city in Scotland

== Arts and entertainment ==
- Aberdeen (2000 film), a 2000 Norwegian-British film
- Aberdeen (2014 film), a 2014 Hong Kong film
- Aberdeen (2024 film), a Canadian drama film directed by Ryan Cooper and Eva Thomas
- Aberdeen (band), an American rock band
- "Aberdeen" (song), by Cage The Elephant

== Businesses and organisations ==
=== Companies ===
- Aberdeen Group, Edinburgh, Scotland-based global investment company, formerly abrdn plc.
  - Aberdeen Asset Management (1983–2017), investment management company merged into Aberdeen Group plc.
- Aberdeen Strategy and Research, Waltham, Massachusetts-based international marketing intelligence company, previously Aberdeen Group, Inc.

=== Education ===
- Aberdeen Business School, Robert Gordon University, Aberdeen, Scotland
- Aberdeen College, former name of part of North East Scotland College
- Aberdeen Grammar School, Aberdeen, Scotland
- Aberdeen Hall, a university-preparatory school in Kelowna, British Columbia, Canada
- Aberdeen High School (disambiguation)
- University of Aberdeen, Aberdeen, Scotland

== Sports ==
- Aberdeen F.C., a Scottish professional football team
- Aberdeen F.C. Women, a women's football team affiliated with Aberdeen F.C.
- Aberdeen GSFP RFC, an amateur rugby union club in Aberdeen, Scotland
- Aberdeen IronBirds, a Minor League Baseball team in Aberdeen, Maryland, U.S.

== Transportation ==
- Aberdeen Airport (disambiguation)
- Aberdeen station (disambiguation)
- Aberdeen Line, a British shipping company founded in 1825
- Aberdeen (ship), the name of several ships

== See also ==
- Aberdeen Act
- Aberdeen Angus, a Scottish breed of small beef cattle
- Aberdeen Central (disambiguation)
- Aberdeen Gardens (disambiguation)
- Aberdeen Historic District (disambiguation)
- Aberdeen Hospital (disambiguation)
- Aberdeen Quarry, a granite quarry in Colorado
- Aberdonia (disambiguation)
- Battle of Aberdeen (disambiguation)
- Diocese of Aberdeen and Orkney, one of the seven dioceses of the Scottish Episcopal Church
- Etymology of Aberdeen
- Marquess of Aberdeen and Temair, a title in the Peerage of the UK
