= U36 =

U36 may refer to:

== Naval vessels ==
- German submarine U-36, various vessels
- HMS Leith (U36), a sloop of the Royal Navy
- SM U-36 (Austria-Hungary), various vessels

== Other uses ==
- Aberdeen Municipal Airport, in Bingham County, Idaho, United States
- Dodecadodecahedron
- Small nucleolar RNA SNORD36
