= Aberdeen station =

Aberdeen station may refer to:

== Australia ==
- Aberdeen railway station, New South Wales, a railway station

== Canada ==
- Aberdeen station (SkyTrain), a rapid transit station in Richmond, British Columbia

== Hong Kong ==
- Aberdeen station (MTR), a future rapid transit station

== Scotland ==
- Aberdeen bus station, bus station in Aberdeen
- Aberdeen Lifeboat Station, a Royal National Lifeboat Institution (RNLI) marine-rescue facility
- Aberdeen railway station, the current main railway station of Aberdeen
- Railway stations of Aberdeen, a list of historical railway stations in Aberdeen

== United States ==
- Aberdeen station (Maryland), an Amtrak and MARC station in Aberdeen, Maryland
- Aberdeen station (Baltimore and Ohio Railroad), a former station in Aberdeen, Maryland
- Aberdeen station (South Dakota), a former station in Aberdeen, South Dakota
- Aberdeen station (Minneapolis and St. Louis Railway), a former station in Aberdeen, South Dakota
- Aberdeen station (Milwaukee Road), a former station in Aberdeen, South Dakota
- Aberdeen station (Baltimore and Ohio Railroad), a former station in Aberdeen, Maryland
- Aberdeen-Matawan station, a station on New Jersey Transit's North Jersey Coast Line

== See also ==
- Aberdeen (disambiguation)
