= Aberdeen School =

Aberdeen School may refer to:

- International School of Aberdeen
- Aberdeen School District (disambiguation)
- Aberdeen High School (disambiguation)
- Aberdeen International School of Canada, a school in Toronto, Ontario
- Aberdeen Composite School, Aberdeen Saskatchewan; see Prairie Spirit School Division
- One of the colleges or schools at University of Aberdeen, Scotland
- Aberdeen Grammar School, Aberdeen, Scotland
- Aberdeen School, Montreal; see Montreal West High School
- Aberdeen Primary School in Hamilton, New Zealand
