= Aberdeen Line (disambiguation) =

The Aberdeen Line was a shipping company founded in 1825.

Aberdeen Line may also refer to:

- Aberdeen to Inverness Line, railway line in Scotland linking Aberdeen and Inverness
- Aberdeen Railway, historical railway line in Scotland linking Aberdeen and Guthrie
- Edinburgh to Aberdeen Line, railway line in Scotland linking Aberdeen and Edinburgh
- Glasgow to Aberdeen Line, railway line in Scotland linking Glasgow and Edinburgh

== See also ==
- Aberdeen (disambiguation)
