= Aberdeen F.C. (disambiguation) =

Aberdeen F.C. is a Scottish professional football club based in Aberdeen.

Aberdeen F.C. may also refer to:

- Aberdeen F.C. (1881), formed in 1881 and later merged with two other clubs to form the current Aberdeen F.C.
- Aberdeen F.C. Women, the women's division of the club, founded separately in 2011

== See also ==
- Aberdeen (disambiguation)
