= Minneapolis and St. Louis Railroad Depot =

Minneapolis and St. Louis Railroad Depot may refer to:

- Minneapolis and St. Louis Railroad Depot (Belview, Minnesota), listed on the National Register of Historic Places in Redwood County, Minnesota
- Minneapolis and St. Louis Railroad Depot (Aberdeen, South Dakota), listed on the National Register of Historic Places in Brown County, South Dakota
- Minneapolis and St. Louis Railroad Depot (Watertown, South Dakota), listed on the National Register of Historic Places in Codington County, South Dakota
