= Robert Gray Elementary School =

Robert Gray Elementary School can refer to:

- Robert R. Gray Elementary School - Prince George's County, Maryland - Prince George's County Public Schools
- Robert Gray Elementary School - Aberdeen, Washington - Aberdeen School District
- Robert Gray Elementary School - Longview, Washington - Longview Public Schools
