= Aberdeen School District =

Aberdeen School District may refer to:

- Aberdeen School District (Idaho), in Aberdeen, Idaho
- Aberdeen School District (Mississippi), in Aberdeen, Mississippi
- Aberdeen School District (South Dakota), in Aberdeen, South Dakota
- Aberdeen School District (Washington), in Aberdeen, Washington
- Matawan-Aberdeen Regional School District, in Matawan, New Jersey
