= Aberdeen Hospital =

Aberdeen Hospital may refer to:

- Aberdeen Regional Hospital situated in New Glasgow, Nova Scotia, Canada
- Aberdeen Provincial Hospital (Eastern Cape) situated in Aberdeen, Eastern Cape, South Africa

== See also ==
- Aberdeen (disambiguation)
