= Aberdeen Airport (disambiguation) =

Aberdeen Airport is an airport in Aberdeen, Scotland.

Aberdeen Airport may also refer to:

- Aberdeen Municipal Airport in Aberdeen, Idaho, US
- Aberdeen Regional Airport in Aberdeen, South Dakota, US

== See also ==
- Aberdeen (disambiguation)
