= Aberdeen Gardens =

Aberdeen Gardens may refer to:

- Aberdeen Gardens, Washington, census-designated place (CDP) in Grays Harbor County, Washington, US
- Aberdeen Gardens (Hampton, Virginia), historic district in Hampton, Virginia, US

== See also ==
- Aberdeen (disambiguation)
