= Aberdonia =

Aberdonia may refer to:

- Aberdeen city (Latin name)
- Aberdonia (car)
- Aberdonia (yacht)
- 5677 Aberdonia, an asteroid
