= Ernest H. Taves =

American psychiatrist, author and UFO skeptic (1916–2003)

Ernest Henry Taves
- Born: February 1, 1916; Aberdeen, Idaho
- Died: August 16, 2003 (aged 87)
- Education: Undergraduate: Oregon State University; Graduate: Medical degree from New York University School of Medicine; Doctorate: PhD from Columbia University
- Occupation: psychiatrist
- Known for: Author and UFO skeptic
- Spouse: Judith de Forest Taves
- Children: Henry Taves

Ernest Henry Taves (February 1, 1916 – August 16, 2003) was an American psychiatrist, author of three books, two on Mormonism and one on UFOs. He was a scientific skeptic and was a Technical Consultant for the Committee for Skeptical Inquiry. Taves served in Yokohama, Japan after WWII as a Captain in the US Army Medical Corps, chief of the neuropsychiatric section.

== Early life and career ==
Taves was born in Aberdeen, Idaho, where he attended Aberdeen High School. His mother's family was Mormon and his father's Mennonite.

After high school he graduated from Oregon State University. He obtained his doctorate from Columbia University and his medical degree from the New York University School of Medicine. After college, Taves joined the US Army Medical Corps from 1946 to 1948 "reaching the rank of Captain while he was chief of the neuropsychiatric section at the 155th Station Hospital in Yokohama, Japan". Taves moved to New York City after the military, establishing his medical practice in psychoanalysis and psychiatry, then eventually relocating to Cambridge, Massachusetts, in 1954.

== Author ==
In 1969, Taves published his first story, "The Firefighters" in Playboy Magazine. As his writing career started picking up, he began to phase out of his medical career, eventually giving up his medical practice in 1972. His son Henry said that his father had been trying to get published from an early age and was "absolutely thrilled when his story (in Playboy) was actually published".

Taves' skeptical book The UFO Enigma was published in 1977, and co-authored with astrophysicist Donald H. Menzel. The book argued that UFOs are a mixture of hoaxes and misinterpretations of natural phenomena. The subtitle of the book is "The definitive explanation of the UFO phenomenon". "The authors have analyzed a representative number of sightings and have found what they consider to be rational explanations for them in terms of the normal processes of perception combined with possible meteorological conditions and well-known astronomical phenomena. Some they consider to be downright hoaxes or equivalent cases of self-deception."

Taves wrote two books about the Church of Jesus Christ of Latter-day Saints and their history, the first book Trouble Enough: Joseph Smith and the Book of Mormon was published in 1984 and follows the history of Joseph Smith Jr. from the time Smith founded the church, to his assassination, and after until 1869. This is the Place: Brigham Young and the New Zion published in 1991 seeks to validate the authorship of Smith's writings using the stylometric approach. In This is the Place, Taves writes that he found no evidence of multiple authors in the Book of Mormon, contrary to the church's teachings, calling the book a "hoax, yet the religion is growing faster than any other in the U.S.".

== UFO ==
Taves was a Scientific and Technical Consultant of the Committee for Skeptical Inquiry. He, along with Philip J. Klass, James E. Oberg and Daniel Cohen were founding members of the CSICOP UFO subcommittee. UFO expert Robert Sheaffer writes in his 1981 book UFO Verdict that the subcommittee was "the first ufological group formed by individuals 'not inclined to believe in the literal truth of UFO claims'".

== Personal life ==
According to his son Henry, Taves was an amateur radio fan, and was part of a very small group of "county hunters" which attempt to "make contact with every single county radio station" and be on air. The task took five or six years. He was also "dedicated to the conservation of the New Hampshire rural landscape, protecting several tracts of land by donating cash and conservation easements. Described by his son (Henry) as 'congenial, distinguished, and a stickler for the English language,' Dr. Taves enjoyed golfing at his winter home in Naples, Florida. He was also a proprietor of the Boston Athenaeum and a member of the Port Royal Club of Naples". Taves' wife was Judith deForest Taves who predeceased him. For reasons he and his wife could not remember, she nicknamed him "Pancho" and in his retirement years, he used the name more often than Ernest. His wife grew and showed roses and kept him surrounded with them, Traves said '"always on my desk are one or two roses"'. The couple spent winters in Naples, Florida, since 1949, the rest of the year they lived in their homes in Massachusetts and New Hampshire.

Taves died in a Naples hospital from a heart attack.

== Publications ==
- The UFO Enigma: The Definitive Explanation of the UFO Phenomenon (1977) [with Donald H. Menzel]
- Trouble Enough: Joseph Smith and the Book of Mormon (1984)
- This is the Place: Brigham Young and the New Zion (1991)
