= Peersia frithii =

Scientific classification
- Kingdom: Plantae
- Clade: Tracheophytes
- Clade: Angiosperms
- Clade: Eudicots
- Order: Caryophyllales
- Family: Aizoaceae
- Genus: Peersia
- Species: P. frithii

Binomial name
- Peersia frithii (L.Bolus) L.Bolus

Synonyms
- Mesembryanthemum frithii L.Bolus; Rhinephyllum frithii (L.Bolus) L.Bolus

Species of succulent

Peersia frithii is a small succulent plant in the Aizoaceae family. The species is endemic to South Africa and occurs in the Northern Cape, Eastern Cape and Western Cape from Laingsburg to Aberdeen. The plant has a range of 28 913 km^{2} but has lost some of its habitat to overgrazing and trampling by livestock.
