= Battle of Aberdeen =

Battle of Aberdeen may refer to:

- Battle of Aberdeen (1644), an engagement in the Wars of the Three Kingdoms
- Battle of Aberdeen (1646), fought on 14 May 1646 during the Scottish Civil War
- Battle of Aberdeen (Andaman Islands), fought on May 17, 1859 between the Andamanese Scheduled Tribe and the British in Northwest Port Blair, South Andaman Island, one of the Andaman Islands

== See also ==
- Aberdeen (disambiguation)
