= Aberdeen Central =

Aberdeen Central may refer to:

- Aberdeen Central (UK Parliament constituency)
- Aberdeen Central (Scottish Parliament constituency)
- Central High School (Aberdeen, South Dakota)

== See also ==
- Aberdeen (disambiguation)
