= Philadelphia Subdivision =

Rail line in Pennsylvania, Delaware and Maryland

Coordinates: 39°54′10.2″N 75°8′24.1″W

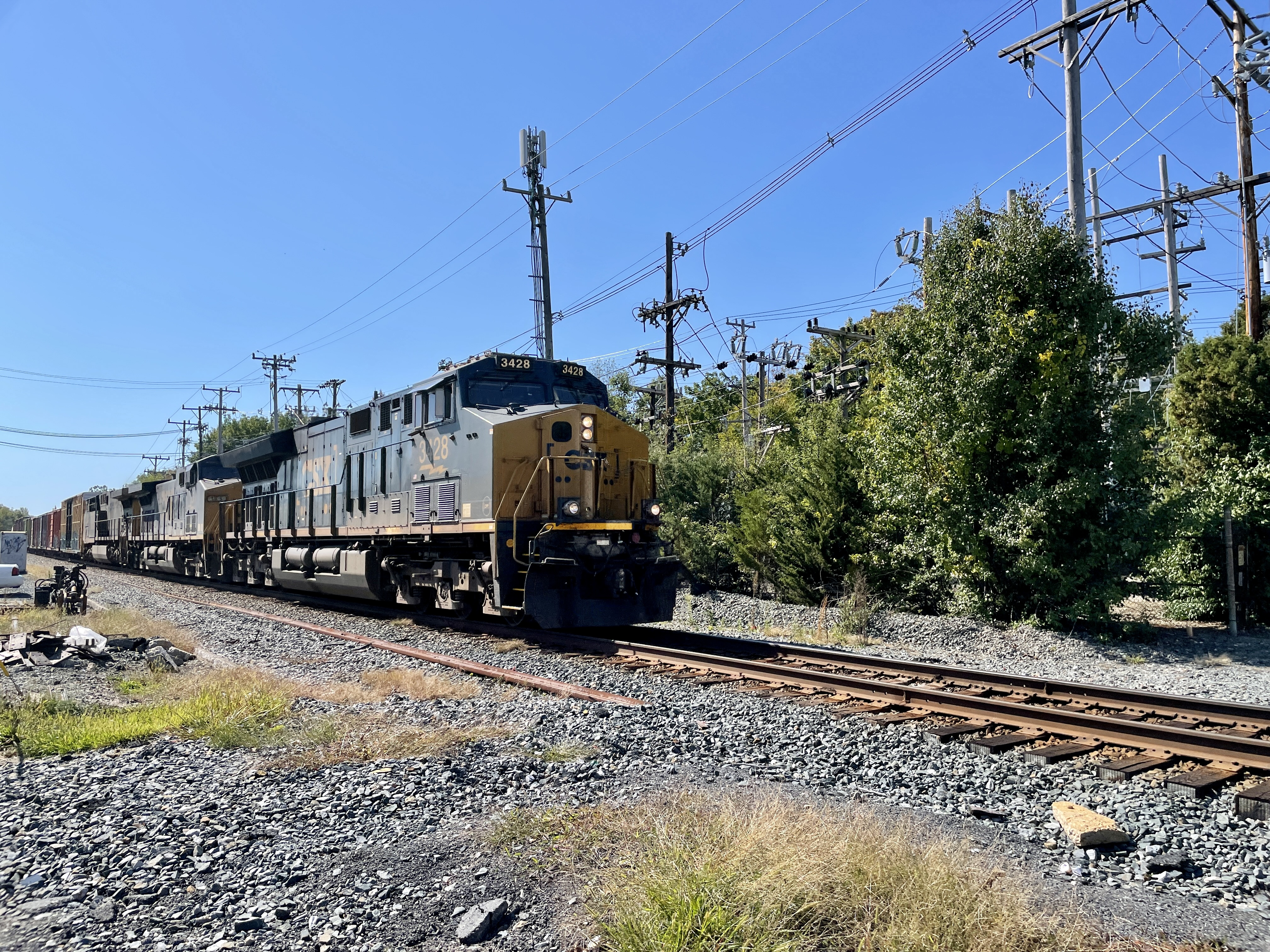
- Northbound CSX Transportation manifest train on the Philadelphia Subdivision in Newark, Delaware

Overview
- Status: Operational
- Owner: CSX Transportation
- Locale: Pennsylvania, Delaware, and Maryland
- Termini: Philadelphia, Pennsylvania; Baltimore, Maryland

Service
- Type: Freight rail
- System: CSX Transportation
- Operator: CSX Transportation

Technical
- Number of tracks: 1-2
- Track gauge: 1,435 mm (4 ft 8 1/2 in) standard gauge

Philadelphia Subdivision

The Philadelphia Subdivision is a railroad line owned and operated by CSX Transportation in the U.S. states of Pennsylvania, Delaware, and Maryland. The line runs from Philadelphia, Pennsylvania, southwest to Baltimore, Maryland, along a former Baltimore and Ohio Railroad (B&O) line.

At its north end, CP NICE, in Nicetown-Tioga, Philadelphia, the Philadelphia Subdivision becomes the Trenton Subdivision. The south end of the Philadelphia Subdivision is near Bay View Yard, where the Baltimore Terminal Subdivision begins.

== History ==
The line was built by the Baltimore and Philadelphia Railroad in Pennsylvania and as a branch of the B&O Railroad in Delaware and Maryland. The line began full operation in 1886. North of Philadelphia, the B&O used the lines of the Philadelphia and Reading Railway to reach the New York City area. Passenger train service on the Philadelphia Subdivision was led by the Royal Blue, its flagship train. The B&O ceased operation of passenger trains on the subdivision in 1958, and since then the line has been used only for freight trains.

In the 1970s and 80s the line passed through leases and mergers to CSX.

As of July 2022, Aberdeen, Maryland is restoring the former B&O Aberdeen station, the last remaining station on the line.

== See also ==
- List of CSX Transportation lines
