= Peersia =

Scientific classification
- Kingdom: Plantae
- Clade: Tracheophytes
- Clade: Angiosperms
- Clade: Eudicots
- Order: Caryophyllales
- Family: Aizoaceae
- Genus: Peersia; L.Bolus

Genus of flowering plant

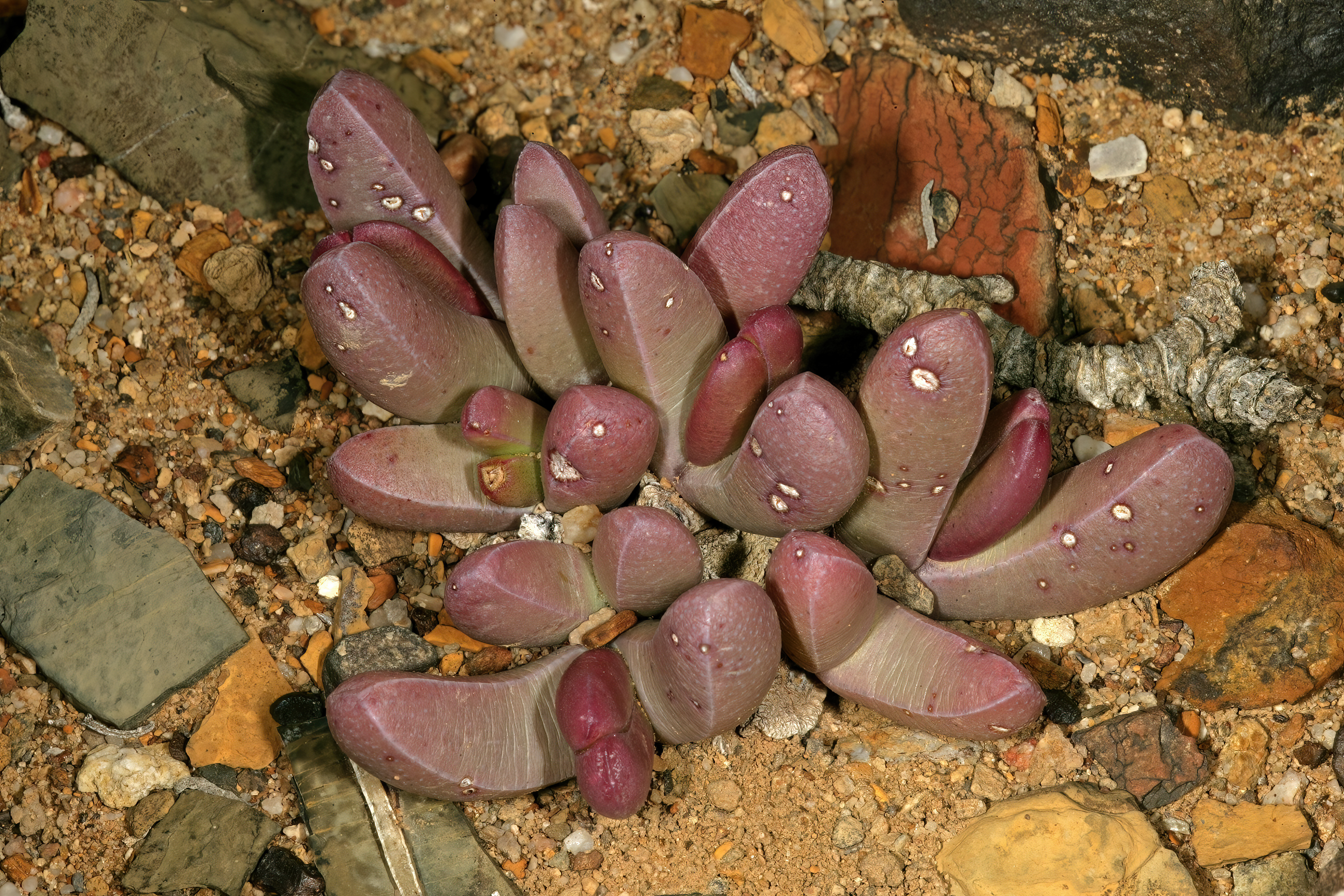
Peersia macradenia

Peersia is a genus of flowering plants belonging to the family Aizoaceae.

It is native to the Cape Provinces in the South African Republic.

The genus name of Peersia is in honour of Victor Stanley Peers (1874–1940), an Australian botanist, plant collector, and amateur archeologist. It was first described and published in Fl. Pl. South Africa Vol.7 on table 264 in 1927.

== Known species ==
According to Kew:

- Peersia frithii (L.Bolus) L.Bolus
- Peersia macradenia (L.Bolus) L.Bolus
- Peersia vanheerdei (L.Bolus) H.E.K.Hartmann
