= Central Park, Washington =

- CDP
- Location of Central Park, Washington
- Coordinates: 46°58′14″N 123°42′07″W
- Country: United States
- State: Washington
- County: Grays Harbor

Area
  - Total: 3.5 sq mi (9.1 km^{2})
  - Land: 3.5 sq mi (9.1 km^{2})
  - Water: 0 sq mi (0.0 km^{2})
- Elevation: 112 ft (34 m)

Population (2020)
  - Total: 2,841
  - Density: 729/sq mi (281.4/km^{2})
- Time zone: UTC-8 (Pacific (PST))
  - Summer (DST): UTC-7 (PDT)
- ZIP Code: 98520
- Area code(s): 360, 564
- FIPS code: 53-11195
- GNIS feature ID: 2408006

Central Park is a census-designated place (CDP) in Grays Harbor County, Washington, United States. The population was 2,841 at the 2020 census.

== Geography ==
According to the United States Census Bureau, the CDP has a total area of 3.5 square miles (9.1 km^{2}), all of it land.

== Demographics ==
Historical population
Census	Pop.	Note	%±
1960	1,622		—
1970	2,720		67.7%
1980	2,709		−0.4%
1990	2,669		−1.5%
2000	2,558		−4.2%
2010	2,685		5.0%
2020	2,841		5.8%
U.S. Decennial Census; 1960 1970 1980 1990; 2000 2010 2020

Central Park first appeared as an unincorporated place in the 1960 U.S. census; and as a census designated place in the 1980 U.S. census.

=== 2000 census ===
As of the census of 2000, there were 2,558 people, 1,037 households, and 779 families residing in the CDP. The population density was 728.8 people per square mile (281.4/km^{2}). There were 1,092 housing units at an average density of 311.1/sq mi (120.1/km^{2}). The racial makeup of the CDP was 93.86% White, 0.08% African American, 1.25% Native American, 1.21% Asian, 0.08% Pacific Islander, 0.51% from other races, and 3.01% from two or more races. Hispanic or Latino of any race were 1.80% of the population.

There were 1,037 households, out of which 29.7% had children under the age of 18 living with them, 64.4% were married couples living together, 7.7% had a female householder with no husband present, and 24.8% were non-families. 21.4% of all households were made up of individuals, and 10.6% had someone living alone who was 65 years of age or older. The average household size was 2.47 and the average family size was 2.83.

In the CDP, the population was spread out, with 23.2% under the age of 18, 5.4% from 18 to 24, 23.9% from 25 to 44, 29.4% from 45 to 64, and 18.1% who were 65 years of age or older. The median age was 44 years. For every 100 females, there were 98.8 males. For every 100 females age 18 and over, there were 98.6 males.

The median income for a household in the CDP was $45,719, and the median income for a family was $50,313. Males had a median income of $41,081 versus $30,208 for females. The per capita income for the CDP was $21,003. About 6.4% of families and 7.3% of the population were below the poverty line, including 5.8% of those under age 18 and 9.7% of those age 65 or over.

== Education ==
Almost all of Central Park is in the Aberdeen School District.
