= Conan Doyle (cricketer) =

South African cricketer and South African Army soldier

Personal information
- Full name: Conan Doyle
- Born: 5 March 1917; Aberdeen, Cape Province, South Africa
- Died: 24 October 1942 (aged 25); El Alamein, Kingdom of Egypt
- Batting: Right-handed

Domestic team information
- Years: Team
- 1937/38: Orange Free State

Career statistics
Competition	First-class
Matches	2
Runs scored	41
Batting average	10.25
100s/50s	–/–
Top score	29
Catches/stumpings	–/–
- Source: Cricinfo, 10 June 2022

Conan 'Connie' Doyle (1913 – 24 October 1942) was a South African first-class cricketer and South African Army soldier.

Doyle was born in Cape Province at Aberdeen in 1913. Doyle made two appearances in first-class cricket for Orange Free State against Eastern Province and North Eastern Transvaal in the 1937–38 Currie Cup, with both matches played at Bloemfontein. He scored 41 runs in these matches, with a high score of 29. In his second match, he was one of the wickets to fall in William Henderson's hat-trick (the others being Dirk Pretorius and Henry Sparks); Henderson ended up taking five wickets in six balls and finished with figures of 7 for 4 to bowl out Orange Free State for 46 in their second innings.

Doyle served in the South African Army during the Second World War as a private with the 1st Battalion, Transvaal Scottish. He took part in the Second Battle of El Alamein, during which he killed in action on 24 October 1942. He is commemorated at the El Alamein War Cemetery.
