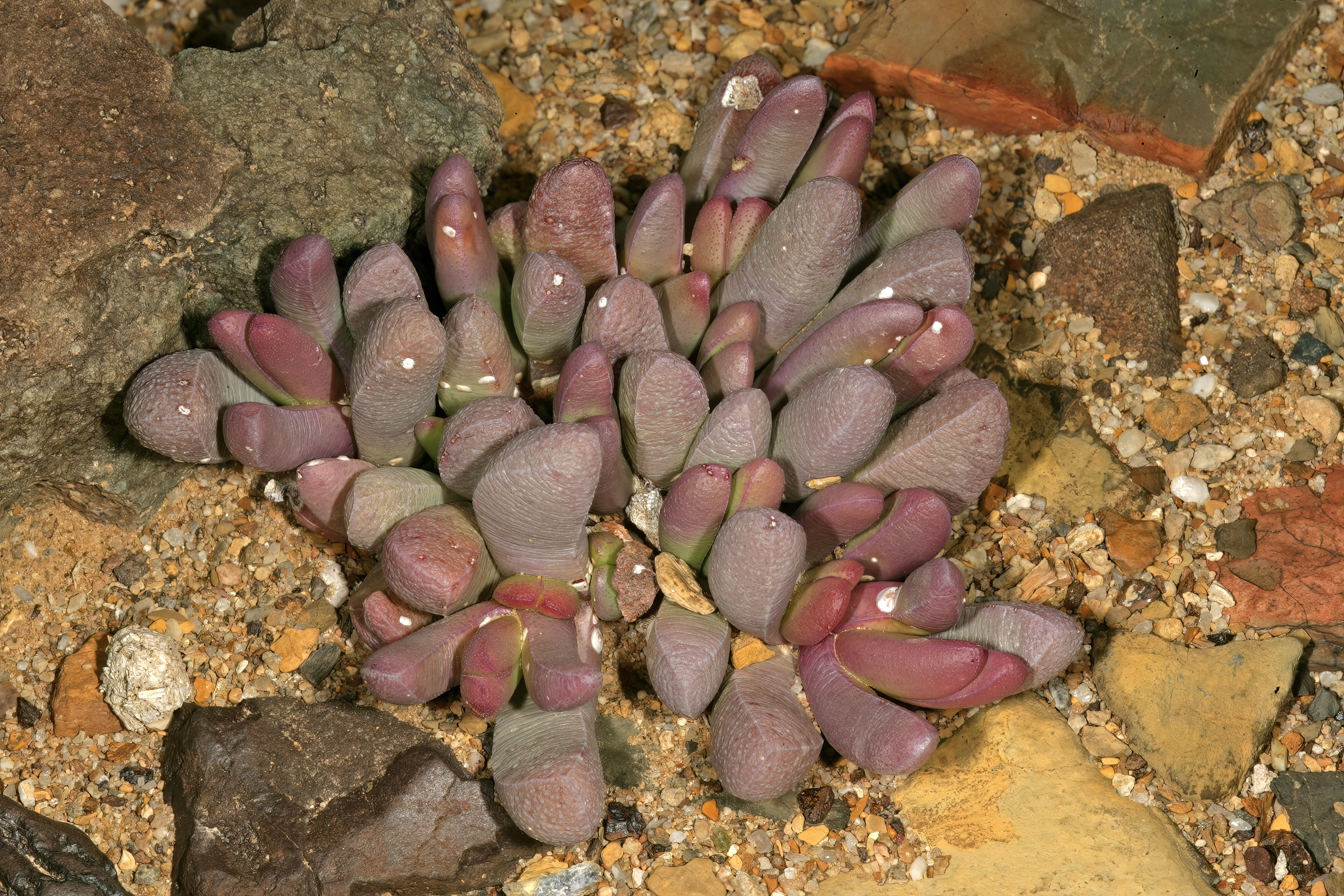

Scientific classification
- Kingdom: Plantae
- Clade: Tracheophytes
- Clade: Angiosperms
- Clade: Eudicots
- Order: Caryophyllales
- Family: Aizoaceae
- Genus: Peersia
- Species: P. macradenia

Binomial name
- Peersia macradenia (L.Bolus) L.Bolus

Synonyms
- Mesembryanthemum macradenium L.Bolus; Rhinephyllum macradenium (L.Bolus) L.Bolus

= Peersia macradenia =

Species of succulent

Peersia macradenia is a small succulent plant that is part of the Aizoaceae family. The species is endemic to South Africa and occurs in the Western Cape.
