= Aberdeen High School =

Aberdeen High School may refer to:

== Canada ==
- Aberdeen High School (New Brunswick), Moncton, New Brunswick

== United States ==
- Aberdeen High School (Idaho), Aberdeen, Idaho
- Aberdeen High School (Maryland), Aberdeen, Maryland
- Aberdeen High School (Washington), Aberdeen, Washington
- Central High School (Aberdeen, South Dakota)

== See also ==
- Aberdeen (disambiguation)
- Aberdeen Grammar School, Aberdeen, Scotland
