= Kearns Building =

Building in Salt Lake City, Utah, U.S.

- U.S. National Register of Historic Places
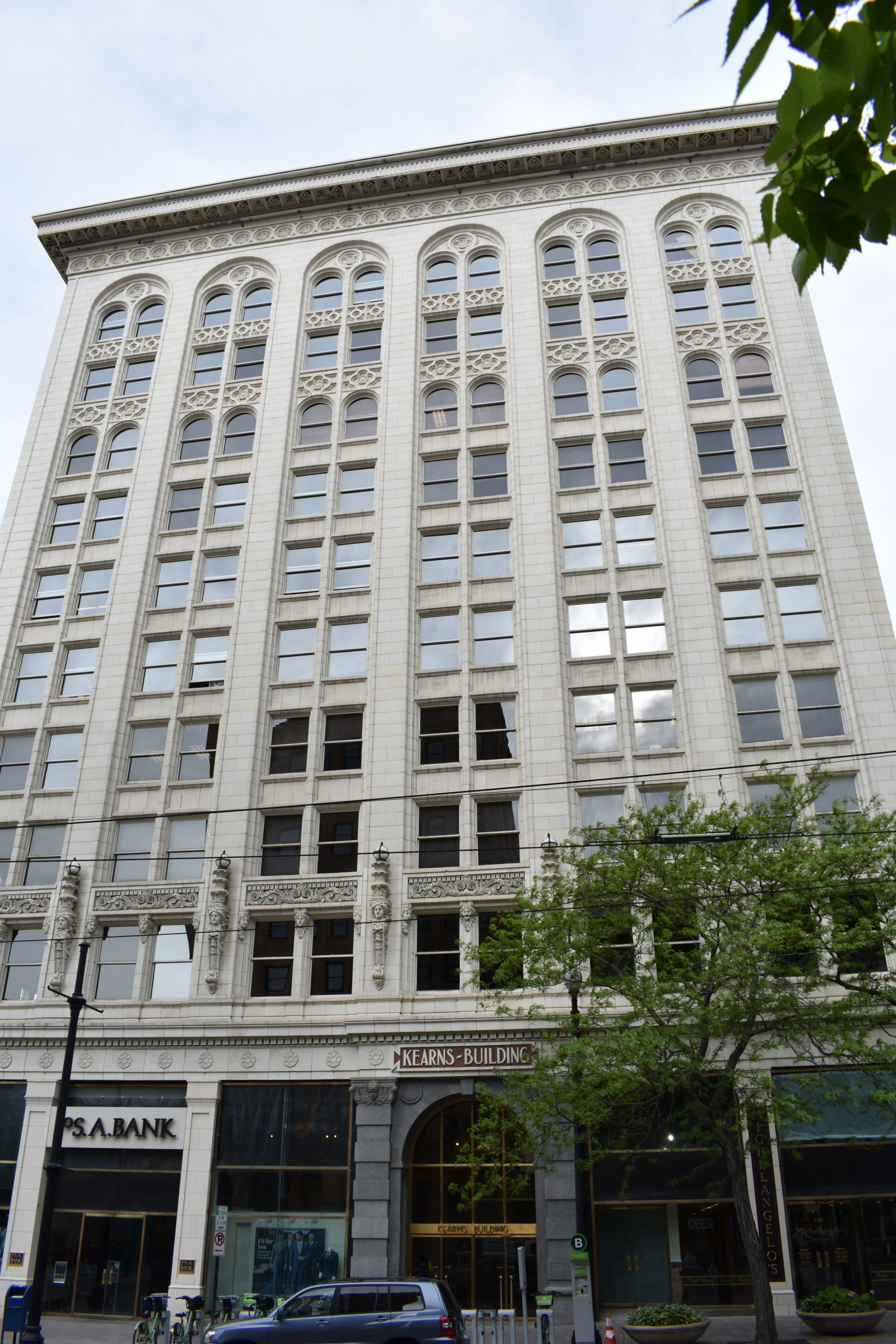
- Kearns Building, May 2019

- Location within Utah Location within the United States
- Location: 132 South Main Street; Salt Lake City, Utah; United States
- Coordinates: 40°45′58″N 111°53′27″W
- Area: 0 acres (0 ha)
- Built: 1909
- Built by: George Curley
- Architect: Parkinson & Bergstrom
- Architectural style: Late 19th And Early 20th Century American Movements, Sullivanesque
- MPS: Salt Lake City Business District MRA
- NRHP reference No.: 82004145
- Added to NRHP: August 17, 1982

The Kearns Building is a historic office building in Salt Lake City, Utah, United States, that is listed on the National Register of Historic Places (NRHP).

== Description ==
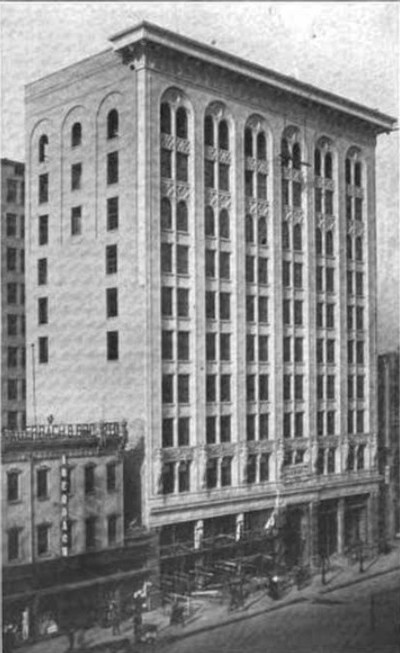
The Kearns Building in 1911

The 10-story building was designed by Los Angeles architects John Parkinson and George Bergstrom and constructed 1909–1911. Parkinson & Bergstrom borrowed the style of architect Louis Sullivan, and the Kearns Building has been described as Sullivanesque, with a steel reinforced concrete frame and a white terracotta tile facade emphasizing vertical piers below a prominent cornice. The building was added to the National Register of Historic Places in 1982.

The style of a Louis Sullivan skyscraper was built on classical form, with prominent window and door openings at street level, bands of windows between vertical piers, and a distinctive, highly decorated cornice. Often Sullivan designed porthole windows under a cornice. Parkinson & Bergstrom used centered medallions between spandrels recessed behind the plane of piers to achieve a similar appearance.

The Kearns Building was named for Thomas Kearns, a wealthy former Utah senator and major stockholder in The Salt Lake Tribune. During construction of the building, Kearns was accused of manipulating the city council and its building code.

A third of office space in the building was rented prior to opening in February, 1911, and most of the offices were rented by April of that year. Early tenants of the building included clothiers Gardner & Adams Co. and Rowe & Kelly, and the building included what was billed as "the most beautiful buffet in the United States," the Mecca.

== See also ==
- National Register of Historic Places listings in Salt Lake City
- Aberdeen Quarry, the source of granite used for the first-floor columns and entrance archway
- Chicago school (architecture)
