= Peersia vanheerdei =

Scientific classification
- Kingdom: Plantae
- Clade: Tracheophytes
- Clade: Angiosperms
- Clade: Eudicots
- Order: Caryophyllales
- Family: Aizoaceae
- Genus: Peersia
- Species: P. vanheerdei

Binomial name
- Peersia vanheerdei (L.Bolus) H.E.K.Hartmann

Synonyms
- Rhinephyllum vanheerdei L.Bolus

Species of succulent

Peersia vanheerdei is a small succulent plant that is part of the Aizoaceae family. The species is endemic to South Africa and occurs in the Northern Cape and the Western Cape.
