= New Aberdeen (disambiguation) =

New Aberdeen may refer to:

- New Aberdeen, part of the City of Aberdeen, Scotland.
- New Aberdeen, Nova Scotia
- New Aberdeen Stadium, a proposed sports stadium in Aberdeen, Scotland
- New Aberdeen, South Australia, part of Burra, South Australia
- The original name for Aberdeen Township, New Jersey
