= Aberdeen Historic District =

Aberdeen Historic District may refer to:

- Aberdeen Downtown Historic District, Aberdeen, Mississippi, listed on the National Register of Historic Places (NRHP) in Monroe County, Mississippi
- North Aberdeen Historic District, Aberdeen, Mississippi, listed on the NRHP in Monroe County, Mississippi
- South Central Aberdeen Historic District, Aberdeen, Mississippi, listed on the NRHP in Monroe County, Mississippi
- Aberdeen Historic District (Aberdeen, North Carolina)
- Aberdeen Commercial Historic District, Aberdeen, South Dakota, listed on the NRHP in Brown County, South Dakota
- Aberdeen Highlands Historic District, Aberdeen, South Dakota, listed on the NRHP in Brown County, South Dakota
- Aberdeen Historic District (Aberdeen, South Dakota)

== See also ==
- Aberdeen (disambiguation)
