= Aberdeen (Disputanta, Virginia) =

Historic house in Virginia, United States

- U.S. National Register of Historic Places
- Virginia Landmarks Register
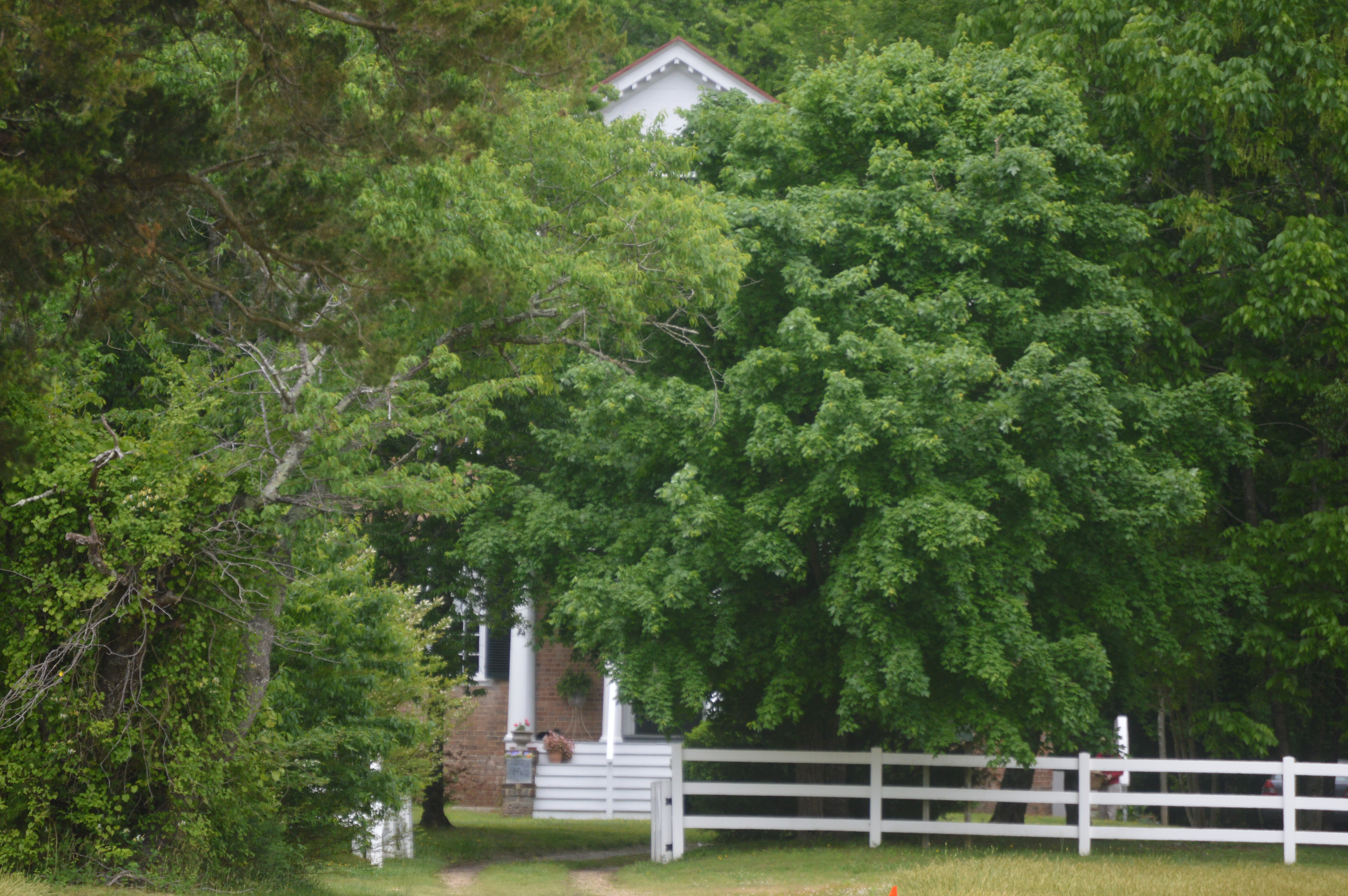
- Roadside view of the house

- Location within Virginia Location within the United States
- Location: 15301 State Route 10, Disputanta, Virginia
- Coordinates: 37°13′35″N 77°08′43″W
- Area: 378 acres (153 ha)
- Built: c. 1810
- Architectural style: Mid 19th Century Revival
- NRHP reference No.: 01001569
- VLR No.: 074-0001

Significant dates
- Added to NRHP: February 11, 2002
- Designated VLR: September 12, 2001

Aberdeen is a historic plantation house located several miles north of Disputanta, Prince George County, Virginia. It was built sometime between 1790 and 1810, by Thomas Cocke. In 1790 Thomas inherited a 1,685-acre portion of his father's estate, Bonnacord, which he named "Aberdeen." Thomas's brother, John P. Cocke, inherited the remainder of Bonnacord. Thomas married Sarah Colley, daughter of Nathaniel and Martha Batte Colley of Tar Bay Plantation located about five miles west of Bonnacord.

== Architecture ==
Aberdeen is an imposing brick temple-form house. The main facade features an imposing pediment finished with horizontal flush sheathing. The walls are laid in Flemish bond with flat arches over the openings. A diminutive portico with Doric order columns is the central feature. It, and the main roof have cornices with block modillions. A lateral hall runs across the entire front of the house, which is reflected in the side elevations that each have a door and two windows on the first floor below three windows on the second floor. Aberdeen is one of a group of houses in Virginia that have this plan and front elevation. They occur over a long period and are scattered randomly across the state. Aberdeen also features important Federal interior woodwork in remarkably in undisturbed condition. The house sits in a picturesque grove of trees in front of woodland and wetlands. Between the fenced yard and the main road are flat farm fields typical of Tidewater Virginia still in cultivation, as they have been for at least three centuries. On these and other fields, Thomas Cocke and his close friend Edmund Ruffin conducted experiments in fertilization that led to Ruffin's publications that revolutionized agriculture.

Aberdeen was listed on the National Register of Historic Places in 2002.
