= Railway stations of Aberdeen =

Aberdeen railway station can refer to one of several railway stations in the city of Aberdeen, Scotland. Aberdeen railway station and Dyce railway station are the only ones currently open.

== Those with Aberdeen in the station name ==
- Aberdeen Ferryhill railway station, original terminus of the Aberdeen Railway, opened 1 April 1854 and closed 2 August 1854.
- Aberdeen Guild Street railway station, on the Aberdeen Railway; used as a freight terminal after the construction of the Joint station, opened 2 August 1854 and closed 4 November 1867.
- Aberdeen Joint railway station, on Denburn Valley Line connecting the Great North of Scotland Railway (GNoSR) and Aberdeen Railway, removing the need for road transport between Guild Street and Waterloo station. Opened 4 November 1867 and renamed Aberdeen in 1952.
- Aberdeen Kittybrewster railway station, original terminus of the Great North of Scotland Railway, opened 20 September 1854 and closed 1 August 1856, when replaced by station named Kittybrewster on the new line to Aberdeen Waterloo.
- Aberdeen Waterloo railway station, the city terminus of the Great North of Scotland Railway opened 1 April 1856 and closed 4 November 1867.

== Those without Aberdeen in the station name ==
- Don Street railway station Opened by the GNoSR 1 July 1887, closed 5 April 1937.
- Dyce railway station Opened 20 September 1854.
- Holburn Street railway station Opened by the GNoSR 2 July 1894, closed 5 April 1937.
- Hutcheon Street railway station Opened by the GNoSR 1 July 1887, closed 5 April 1937.
- Kittybrewster railway station replaced Aberdeen Kittybrewster in April 1856, and station moved on 4 November 1867 when the joint station opened. Closed on 6 May 1968.
- Schoolhill railway station Opened by the GNoSR in 1893, closed 5 April 1937.

== Sources ==
- Butt, R. V. J. (1995). The Directory of Railway Stations: details every public and private passenger station, halt, platform and stopping place, past and present (1st ed.). Patrick Stephens Ltd. ISBN 1-85260-508-1.
