= Aberdeen Provincial Hospital (Eastern Cape) =

- Eastern Cape Department of Health

Geography
- Location: Aberdeen, Sarah Baartman District Municipality, Eastern Cape, South Africa
- Coordinates: 32°28′27″S 24°03′14″E

Organisation
- Care system: Public
- Type: Community

Services
- Emergency department: Yes

Links
- Website: Aberdeen Hospital
- Lists: Hospitals in South Africa
- Other links: List of hospitals in South Africa

Aberdeen Provincial Hospital is a Provincial government funded hospital in Aberdeen, Eastern Cape in South Africa.

The hospital departments include Emergency department, Maternity ward, O.P.D. Services, Surgical Services, Medical Services, Pharmacy, Anti-Retroviral (ARV) treatment for HIV/AIDS, Laundry and Kitchen Services.
