= Aberdeen, Nova Scotia =

Community in Nova Scotia, Canada

Coordinates: 45°58′32.2″N 61°2′58.13″W

Aberdeen in Nova Scotia

Aberdeen (Scottish Gaelic: Obar Dheathain) is a small community in the Canadian province of Nova Scotia, located in Inverness County on Cape Breton Island. It is named after the city of Aberdeen in Scotland. Settlement in the area began in 1862.
