= Aberdeen Hall =

Aberdeen Hall Preparatory School

Location
- 950 Academy Way; Kelowna, BC, V1V 3A4; Canada; 49.9361°N 119.4001°W

Information
- Funding type: Private
- Founded: 2004
- Head of School: Christopher Grieve
- Grades: PreK-12
- Enrollment: Approx. 700
- Language: English
- Campus: Suburban
- Colour
- Mascot: Gryph
- Team name: Aberdeen Hall Gryphons
- High School Principal: Heather Nolan Wood
- Junior School Principal: Michael Chobot
- Website: www.aberdeenhall.com
- Last updated: November 23, 2017

Aberdeen Hall is an independent, non-denominational, co-educational, university-preparatory school founded in 2004. Located in Kelowna, British Columbia, Canada, it delivers the British Columbia Ministry of Education curriculum from Preschool to Grade 12.

== Facilities ==
Aberdeen Hall's only campus is located near the University of British Columbia's Okanagan campus and has an Early Learning Centre (housing Preschool to Kindergarten), a Junior Hall (housing grades 1–5) and a Senior Hall (housing grades 6–12) with a Great Hall common area.

Aberdeen Hall relies heavily on private fundraising to expand its campus and facilities. As of November 30, 2020 they are currently campaigning for a new gym and wellness centre to expand their on campus offerings.
