= Aberdeen Quarry =

Granite quarry in Colorado

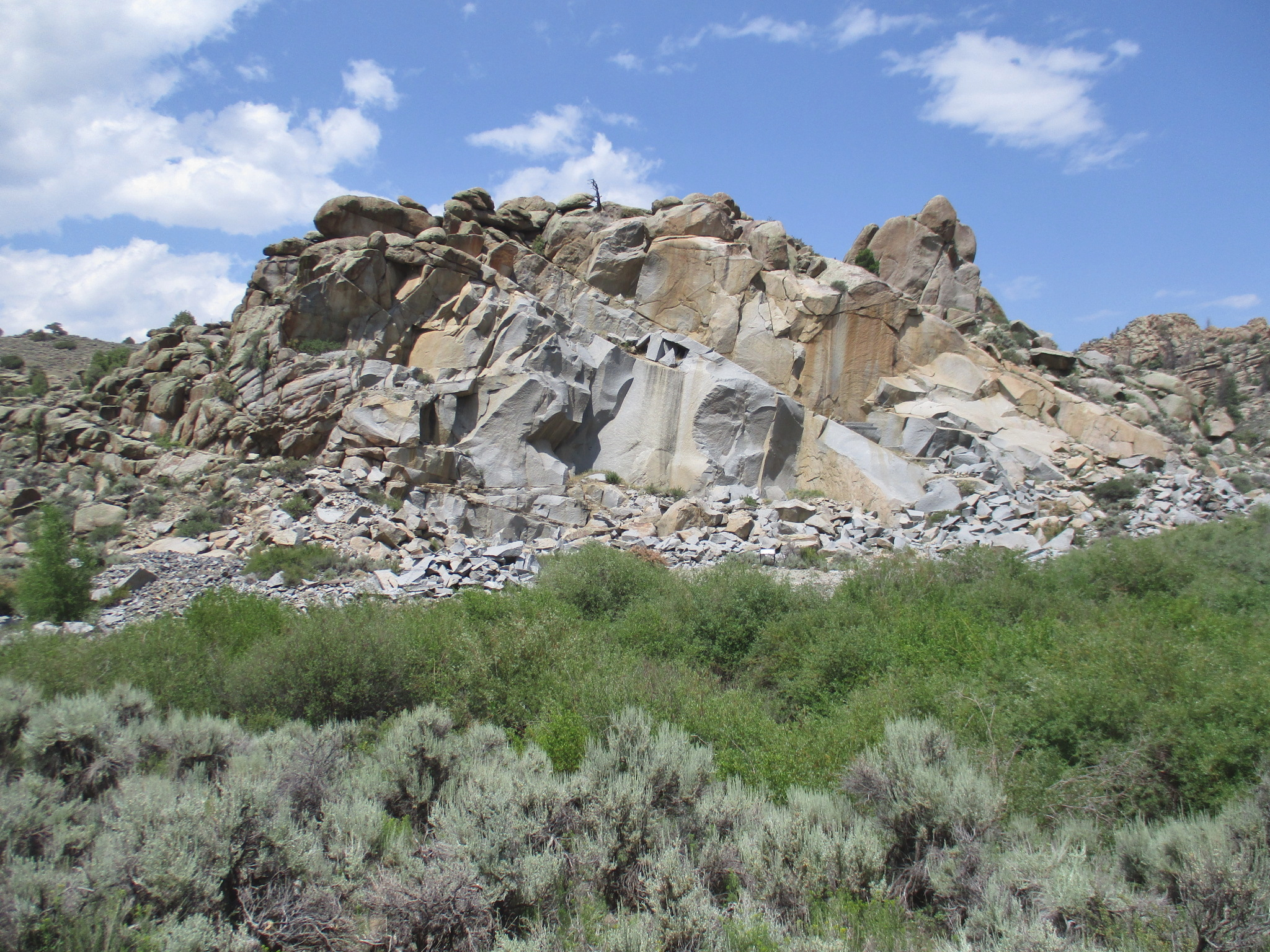
- Aberdeen Quarry, 2021

- Location of Aberdeen, Colorado. Aberdeen (Colorado)
- Location: Gunnison County, Colorado, United States; 38.4503°N 106.9869°W
- Products: gray granite
- Opened: 1889
- Closed: 1991 (deed transferred to historical society)
Gunnison County Historic Landmark
- Designated: December 17, 1996

The Aberdeen Quarry is an abandoned granite quarry in Gunnison County, Colorado. It is located along South Beaver Creek, 7 mi (11 km) south-southwest of Gunnison.

The Aberdeen Quarry was most active from 1889 to 1892 as it supplied granite for the construction of the Colorado State Capitol Building. During this three-year period, the small town of Aberdeen supported the work at the quarry. Afterward, smaller amounts of granite were sporadically quarried for at least three decades. The abandoned quarry and associated town site are now owned by a local historical society, and the quarry is a Gunnison County Historic Landmark.

The quarry was named after Aberdeen, the granite-producing city in Scotland.

== Geology ==
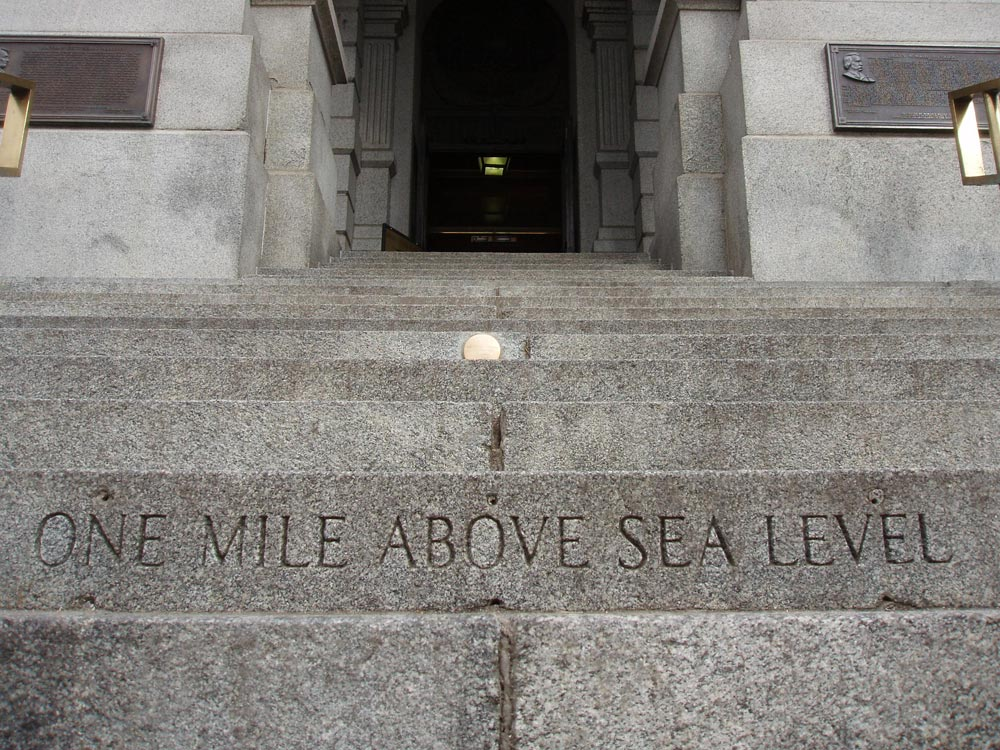
Texture and color of Aberdeen granite as seen in the steps and exterior walls of the Colorado State Capitol

The Aberdeen Quarry is located on the southwest rim of a 6 mi (9.7 km)-wide ring dike, part of what is called the Gunnison annular complex. The dike was intruded into Protozoic metamorphic rock, primarily amphibolite and metasandstone, approximately 1.7 billion years ago. Erosion and removal of younger, overlying rock and the adjacent Proterozoic metamorphic rock has exposed the dike, which is composed of tonalite, granodiorite, and granite. The quarry was within a map unit of tonalite and granodiorite when mapped by geologists in 2001.

== History ==
In April 1889, local stonemason Fredrick G. Zugelder filed a claim on an outcrop of granite looming above South Beaver Creek outside of Gunnison. Zugelder recognized the quality of the granite and presented a sample from the claim to managers who were tasked with choosing the stone for the exterior of the State Capitol Building being built in Denver. The building managers examined dozens of rock samples from across the state and considered the quarries and their respective capacities to supply the needed granite in just a few-years time. On June 26, 1889, it was announced that the Zugelder Quarry granite would be used to construct the superstructure the State Capitol Building. Within days, Scotsman David Duff Seerie (one of the capitol contractors), Zugelder, and Zugelder's cousin filed a claim to the quarry. This claim gave the quarry the name Aberdeen.

William Geddes and Seerie had been contracted to build the capitol's superstructure and it was this firm that oversaw the quarrying at Aberdeen. Zugleder served in several roles at the quarry including yard foreman. Work was quick and quarrying was underway within weeks.

Wagon roads provided access to the Aberdeen Quarry, but the quarried stone would need to be shipped to Denver by rail. A narrow-gage Denver and Rio Grande line passed approximately 5 mi (8.0 km) north of the quarry, and the railroad agreed to build, at their own expense, a spur to the quarry. Construction of the spur began on June 30, 1889, and within a month the spur allowed delivery of needed quarrying equipment. By August 1, 50 to 60 workers were working the quarry, and on August 14, the first load of granite left Aberdeen bound for Denver.

The small community of Aberdeen arose along South Beaver Creek near the quarry, and it is estimated that the population ranged from 150 to 200 people during the three years the Capitol granite was quarried. The Aberdeen post office operated from February 15, 1890, until June 16, 1891. There was a small school and a general store. Many of the workers lived in a large bunk house and ate in a meal hall. Others, particularly those with families, lived in cabins and tents.

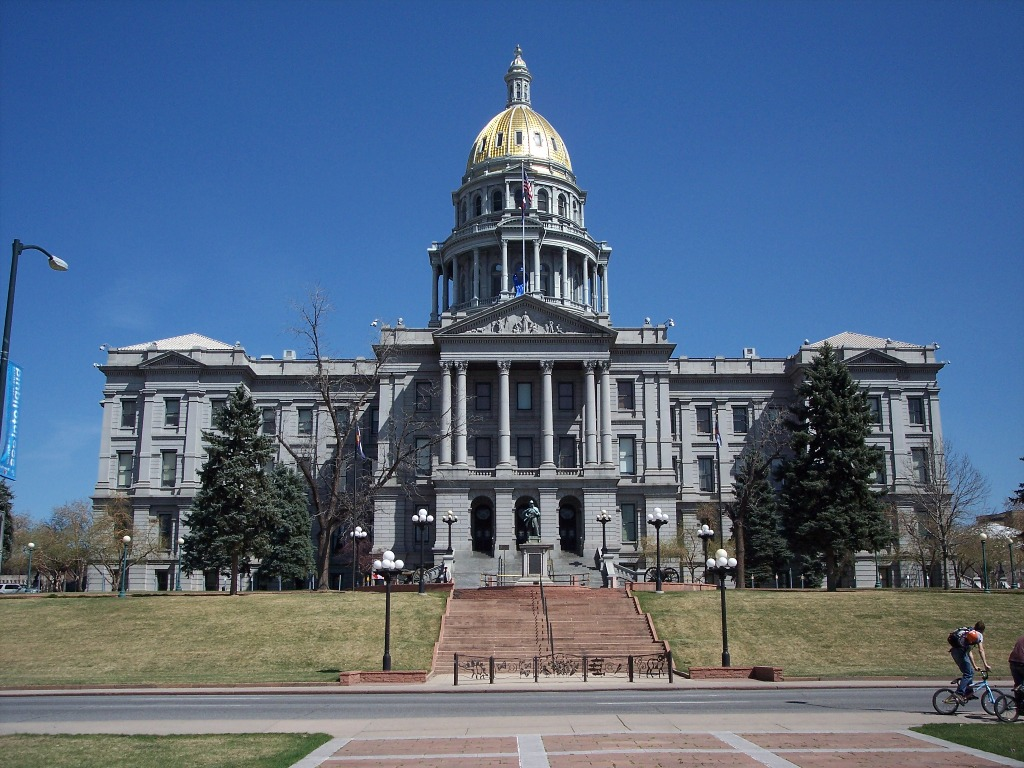
Gray Aberdeen granite as seen on the exterior walls of the Colorado State Capitol, 2006

Nearly all the skilled quarrymen were recruited from elsewhere, including Maine, Massachusetts, Pennsylvania, and Missouri. The skill of these quarrymen was apparent when the quarrymen union called a strike in June 1891. Among the quarrymen's demands were a reduction in work hours from 10 hours a day to nine hours a day and to have Sundays off. They also asked for the same weekly pay. Contractors Geddis and Seerie resisted and chose to hire non-union workers to replace the strikers. Production was so low that in just one week's time, the company asked for a settlement. Most of the strikers’ demands were met and they returned to work the next day.

The granite blocks shipped to Denver were large, some weighing 10 or 12 tons. The largest block shipped weighed 20 tons; it was to become the building's cornerstone, which was laid with much ceremony on July 4, 1890. An average of 40 carloads of stone were shipped weekly during the three years of production. Once the blocks arrived in Denver, horses hauled the stone to the building site. A crew of 250 workmen, including stone cutters and stone setters, prepared and placed the stones. The architect's plan called for approximately 20,000 different sizes and shapes of stone.

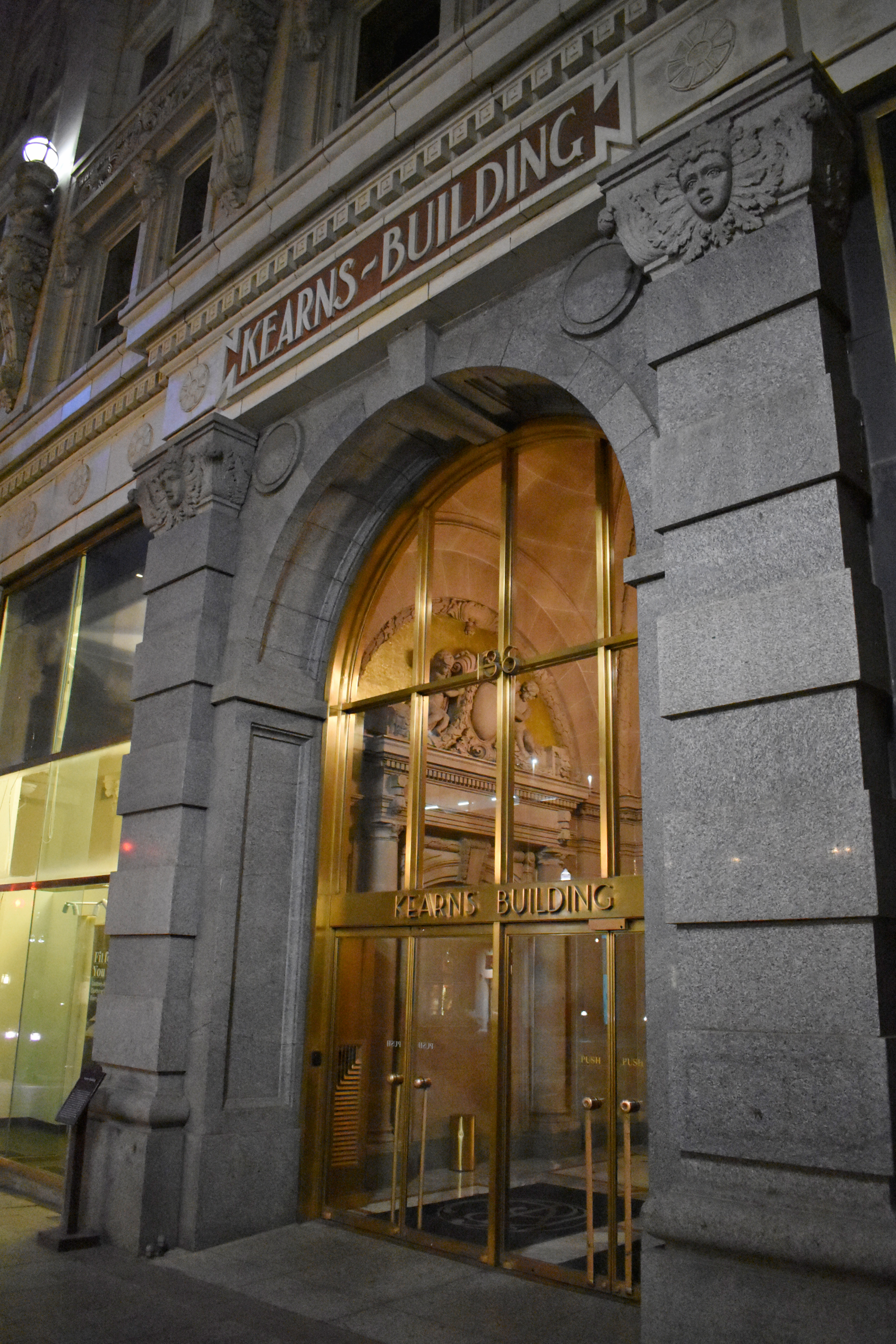
Gray Aberdeen granite as seen on the Kearns Building, 2019

On June 15, 1892, the last stones had shipped and the Aberdeen Quarry operation closed. During the 34 months of production, it is estimated that 280,000 cubic feet (7,900 m^{3}) or 24,000 tons of granite was quarried and shipped to Denver. The operators of the quarry looked for other markets, but no need for granite was found that would justify keeping the quarry open. Quickly, the town of Aberdeen was vacated, and it never was repopulated. The Denver and Rio Grand Railroad vacated the spur to Aberdeen and the tracks were removed in 1904. Without rail access, any hope of reopening the quarry was minimal.

Through the following decades, granite was quarried for much smaller projects including commercial and residential buildings and grave headstones. Stone for the first-floor columns and entrance archway was quarried for the Kearns Building in Salt Lake City, which was completed in 1911. Possibly the last larger project was in 1912 when the quarry supplied granite for the foundation of the State Museum in Denver. At this time it was estimated these additional quarrying efforts produced 10,000 cubic feet (280 m^{3}) of stone. In total, from 1889 to 1912, the quarry produced 290,000 cubic feet (8,200 m^{3}) or 24,500 tons of granite. The amount of stone produced after 1912 was minimal and sporadic.

== Access to Aberdeen ==
In 1991, the quarry was deeded to the Gunnison County Pioneer and Historical Society. The property is located within the Bureau of Land Management’s Hartman Rocks Recreation Area, a network of four-wheel drive roads and mountain bike and motorcycle trails. From a parking area above the quarry on Powerline Road, visitors can walk down to the quarry itself. The old Aberdeen town site just west of the quarry can also be visited though no buildings remain. Access is best during summer and fall.

== See also ==
- Bibliography of Colorado
- Geography of Colorado
- History of Colorado
- Index of Colorado-related articles
- List of Colorado-related lists
  - List of ghost towns in Colorado
  - List of post offices in Colorado
- Outline of Colorado
