= Aberdeen, Florida =

- unincorporated place
- Aberdeen's position in Florida
- Coordinates: 26°33′02″N 80°08′55″W
- Country: United States
- State: Florida
- County: Palm Beach

Area
  - Total: 2.368 sq mi (6.133 km^{2})
  - Land: 2.368 sq mi (6.133 km^{2})
  - Water: 0 sq mi (0.0 km^{2})
- Elevation: 16 ft (4.9 m)

Population (1990)
  - Total: 2,672
- Time zone: UTC-5 (Eastern (EST))
  - Summer (DST): UTC-4 (EDT)
- FIPS code: 12-00050
- GNIS ID: 1867108

Aberdeen was a former census-designated place (CDP) and current unincorporated place located in Palm Beach County, Florida. The population was 2,672 at the 1990 census. It now serves as a neighborhood in the vast swathe of undifferentiated suburbia that lies west of Boynton Beach, Florida. Although the Census Bureau no longer designates Aberdeen as a census-designated place, the neighborhood continues to exist and prosper today.
