= Aberdonia (yacht) =

1935 motor yacht

History

United Kingdom
- Name: 1935-1940, 1946-present Aberdonia; 1940-1946: Navigator
- Namesake: City of Aberdeen (Latin)
- Owner: 1987 – present: Paul King
- Operator: 1940-1946: Royal Navy; 1989 – present: pleasure yacht
- Builder: John I. Thornycroft & Company
- Completed: 1935
- Home port: 1989 – present: Chelsea Harbour
- Status: Leisure craft

General characteristics
- Type: Motor yacht
- Displacement: 20
- Length: 47.97 ft (14.62 m)
- Beam: 11.28 ft (3.44 m)
- Depth: 4.59 ft (1.40 m)
- Propulsion: 2 × Perkins M65 diesel engines (current); 2 × Ford diesel engines (original)

Aberdonia is a British pre-war motor yacht moored at Chelsea Harbour. Built by the Thornycroft ship yard and launched in 1935 Aberdonia has a rich history, former uses include a patrol boat, mine sweeper and is one of the Little ships of Dunkirk.

== World War II service ==
Aberdonia was requisitioned to work as a patrol boat in the Royal Navy attached to HMS Fervant in 1940, at which time she was renamed Navigator. She participated in the evacuation of Allied troops at Dunkirk. The yacht is believed to have made four trips to the shore to take on men cut off by the German army. She worked with the minesweepers and ferried sealed orders between the Admiralty and convoys lying off Shoeburyness and Deal.

Aberdonia was nearly destroyed during her naval service by a downed German bomber whose pilot attempted to guide his falling plane into allied ships. Although she escaped a direct hit she was struck by wreckage on her starboard side. Scorched timbers from the attack were discovered during restoration work thirty years later.

== Postwar service ==
She was completely restored in the late 1980s, including fitting two new Perkins Diesel engines. As of 2011 she is moored in Chelsea Harbour
