= Aberdeen School District (Idaho) =

School district in Idaho, United States

Address
- 318 West Washington Avenue Aberdeen, Idaho, 83210; United States

District information
- Grades: K–12
- Superintendent: C.J. Ward
- NCES District ID: 1600030

Other information
- Telephone: (208) 397-4113
- Website: www.aberdeen58.org

Aberdeen School District is a public school district in Bingham County, Idaho, United States, based in Aberdeen.

== Schools ==
The Aberdeen School District has one elementary school, one middle school and one high school.

== Elementary schools ==
- Aberdeen Elementary School

== Middle schools ==
- Aberdeen Middle School

== High schools ==
- Aberdeen High School
