= Etymology of Aberdeen =

Derivation of the place-name Aberdeen

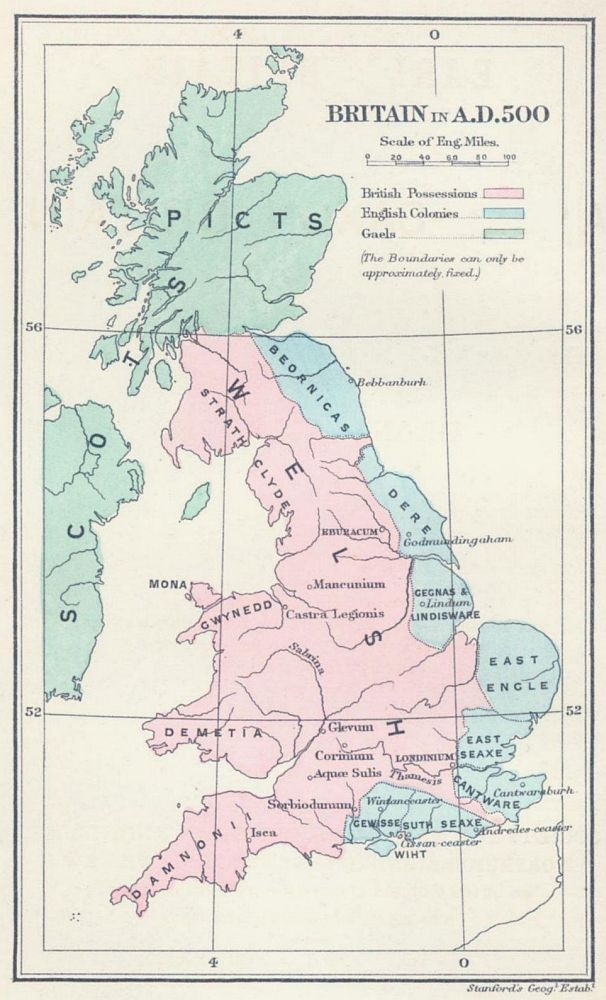
In 500 AD, Aberdeen was a Pictish stronghold. According to one theory, the name originates from their language.

The etymology of Aberdeen is that of the name first used for the city of Aberdeen, Scotland, which then bestowed its name to other Aberdeens around the world, as Aberdonians left Scotland to settle in the New World and other colonies.

Aberdeen is pronounced /ˌæbərˈdiːn/ in Received Pronunciation, and [ˌabərˈdin] (with a short a sound) in Scottish Standard English. The local Doric pronunciation, [ˌeːbərˈdin] or [ˈeːbərdin] (with a long ay sound), is frequently rendered Aiberdein.

== Aberdeen ==
The area in modern times known as Old Aberdeen is the approximate location of the first and original Scottish settlement of Aberdeen. Originally the name was Aberdon which literally means "at the mouth of the Don", as it is situated by the mouth of the river Don.

== Aber- prefix ==
In reference to Aberdeen, Aber- is pronounced locally as [ˈeːbər].

=== Meaning ===
The prefix Aber- means the "confluence of waters", "river mouth" or "the embouchure of a river where it falls into a larger river or the sea. It can also be used as a metaphor for a harbour."

Aber- is used as a prefix in many placenames in Scotland and more often Wales.

=== Origin ===
Aber- is a common Brythonic element, meaning a "confluence". It is presumably that the Pictish language was at least partly P-Celtic as evidenced by various names. Other examples of this prefix in Scotland are Aberfeldy, Aberdour, and Aberbrothick (an old form of Arbroath). In Wales, there are frequent examples such as Aberystwyth and Abertawe (the Welsh for Swansea) are examples. Other Brythonic examples include Falmouth (which is known as Aberfal in Cornish), and Aber Wrac'h in Brittany.

The most likely explanation is the confluence of the Denburn with the Dee.

The Don was several miles from the early settlement of Aberdeen and Old Aberdeen had no connection with Aberdeen and is most likely a corruption of Aulton (auld toun) which still exists as a place name in the Old Aberdeen area.

=== Locations ===
Aber- can be found all over Scotland, predominantly on the east coast.

As well as the east coast of Scotland, places with the prefix Aber- or a variant are found all over Wales, on the west coast of England and in Brittany. They are not found on the east coast of England or in Ireland.

== -deen end element ==
The second element is more contentious. It probably refers to Devona, which is a name of one or both of the Rivers Don and Dee, which may also have Brythonic etymologies (note also the River Dee, Wales).

== Scottish Gaelic ==
Although the north east variety of Scottish Gaelic has died out, it was present in the region (cf. Book of Deer) for centuries, as is attested to by Goidelic placenames in the region such as Inverurie, Banchory, Kincorth and Balgownie and was spoken as recently as 1984 (Braemar).

The Scottish Gaelic name for Aberdeen is Obar Dheathain (IPA: [ˈopəɾ ˈʝɛ.ɪɲ]).

== Greek and Latin sources ==
In 146 AD, Ptolemy wrote that in Celtic times a city named Dēoúana (Δηούανα), commonly latinized as Devana, was the capital of the ancient tribal area Taexali (Ταιξάλοι, Taixáloi). However, although Devana is usually attributed to Aberdeen there is a possibility the capital could have been Barmekyne Hill in Echt,_Aberdeenshire. The general surmise is that the name Devana refers to a river name. However, there is no consensus which river could be meant, as there are several river names resonating with the Graeco-Roman Devana:

- Devana, name of the Denburn (a stream or burn running through the city) and which featured in Ptolemy's System Of Geography of 146 AD;
- Deva for the river Dee (and also the Roman name for other rivers of the same name in Scotland and Wales, as well as the name of the Deva River, Spain);
- Devona for the river Don (and also the name for a Celtic river goddess).

The Romans and subsequently European scholars (using Latin as the lingua franca of scholarship, as did the Catholic Church), referred to Aberdeen with various Latin names well into the modern era:

- Aberdona
- Aberdonia
- Aberdonium
- Aberdonum
- Abredonia
- Devanha (a name referenced in modern times by the street, Devanha Gardens, and the now closed Devanha Distillery and Devanha Brewery)
- Verniconam

== Nicknames ==
Aberdeen also has a number of nicknames, and poetic names:

- "The Granite City" – the most well-known, due to the copious use of local grey granite in the city's older buildings.
- "Furryboots City" – This is a humorous rendering of the Doric, far aboots? ("Whereabouts?"), as in Far aboots ye fae? ("Whereabouts are you from?")
- "The Silver City by the Golden Sands" or often simply just the "Silver City". Less flatteringly, also "the Grey City". This again is partly due to the granite.
- "Oil Capital of Europe" – There are numerous variants on this, such as "Oil Capital of Scotland" etc.
- "Energy Capital of Europe" – the name now being used in the city as it tries to project a "greener" image, not based on oil.

== Academic variations ==
=== Kennedy ===
William Kennedy proposes the spelling variations:

- Aberdaen
- Aberdin
- Aberdene
- Abrydene

=== Orkneyinga saga & Old Norse ===
The Orkneyinga saga records an Old Norse variant of the name, Apardion, clearly cognate with the modern form.

== Unlikely sources ==
There have been more eccentric etymologies, e.g. Boxhorn considered it Phoenician in origin. This is unlikely, however, as no Phoenician sites have been found this far north.

== Residents ==
Residents or natives of Aberdeen are known as Aberdonians, whence Aberdeen F.C.'s nickname, "the Dons".
