= Aberdeen High School (Idaho) =

Location
- 268 South 4th West; Aberdeen, Bingham County, Idaho 83210; United States; 42.941°N 112.845°W

Information
- Type: Public
- NCES District ID: 1600030
- Oversight: Aberdeen S.D. #58
- NCES School ID: 160003000002
- Principal: Travis Pincock
- Teaching staff: 15.32 (on an FTE basis)
- Grades: 9–12
- Enrollment: 222 (2023–24)
- Student to teacher ratio: 15.32
- Colors: Orange and Black
- Mascot: Tiger
- IHSAA Division: 3A
- Website: hs.asd58.us

Aberdeen High School is a public high school in Aberdeen, Idaho.

The current principal is Travis Pincock and the school has 34 faculty members. Enrollment is approximately 200 students in grades 9–12.

== Notable alumni ==
- Ernest H. Taves (1916–2003), psychiatrist, author, and UFO skeptic
- Steve Hayes (b.1955), NBA center, played collegiately at Idaho State
