= Small nucleolar RNA SNORD36 =

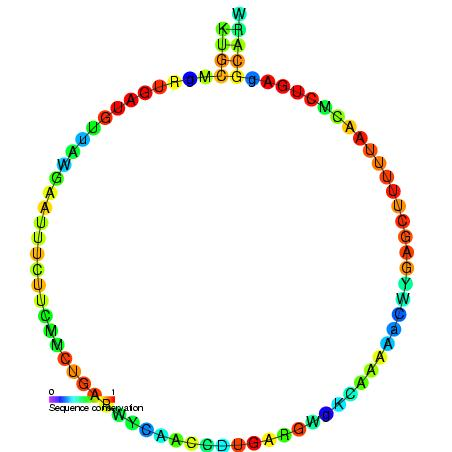
- Predicted secondary structure and sequence conservation of SNORD36

Identifiers
- Symbol: SNORD36
- Alt. Symbols: U36
- Rfam: RF00049

Other data
- RNA type: Gene; snRNA; snoRNA; CD-box
- Domain: Eukaryota
- GO: GO:0006396 GO:0005730
- SO: SO:0000593
- PDB structures: PDBe

In molecular biology, snoRNA U36 (also known as SNORD36) is a non-coding RNA (ncRNA) molecule which functions in the biogenesis (modification) of other small nuclear RNAs (snRNAs). This type of modifying RNA is located in the nucleolus of the eukaryotic cell which is a major site of snRNA biogenesis. It is known as a small nucleolar RNA (snoRNA) and also often referred to as a guide RNA.

snoRNA U36 is a member of the C/D box class of snoRNAs which contain the conserved sequence motifs known as the C box (UGAUGA) and the D box (CUGA). Most of the members of the box C/D family function in directing site-specific 2'-O-methylation of substrate RNAs.

U36 is encoded within the intron of ribosomal protein rpL7a, and has two regions of complementarity to 18S and 28S ribosomal RNA. This complementarity suggests that U36 acts as a 2'-O-ribose methylation guide. This snoRNA is also related to other snoRNAs (snoR47 and Z100) identified in the rice plant Oryza sativa.
