= Aberdeen station (Baltimore and Ohio Railroad) =

Aberdeen
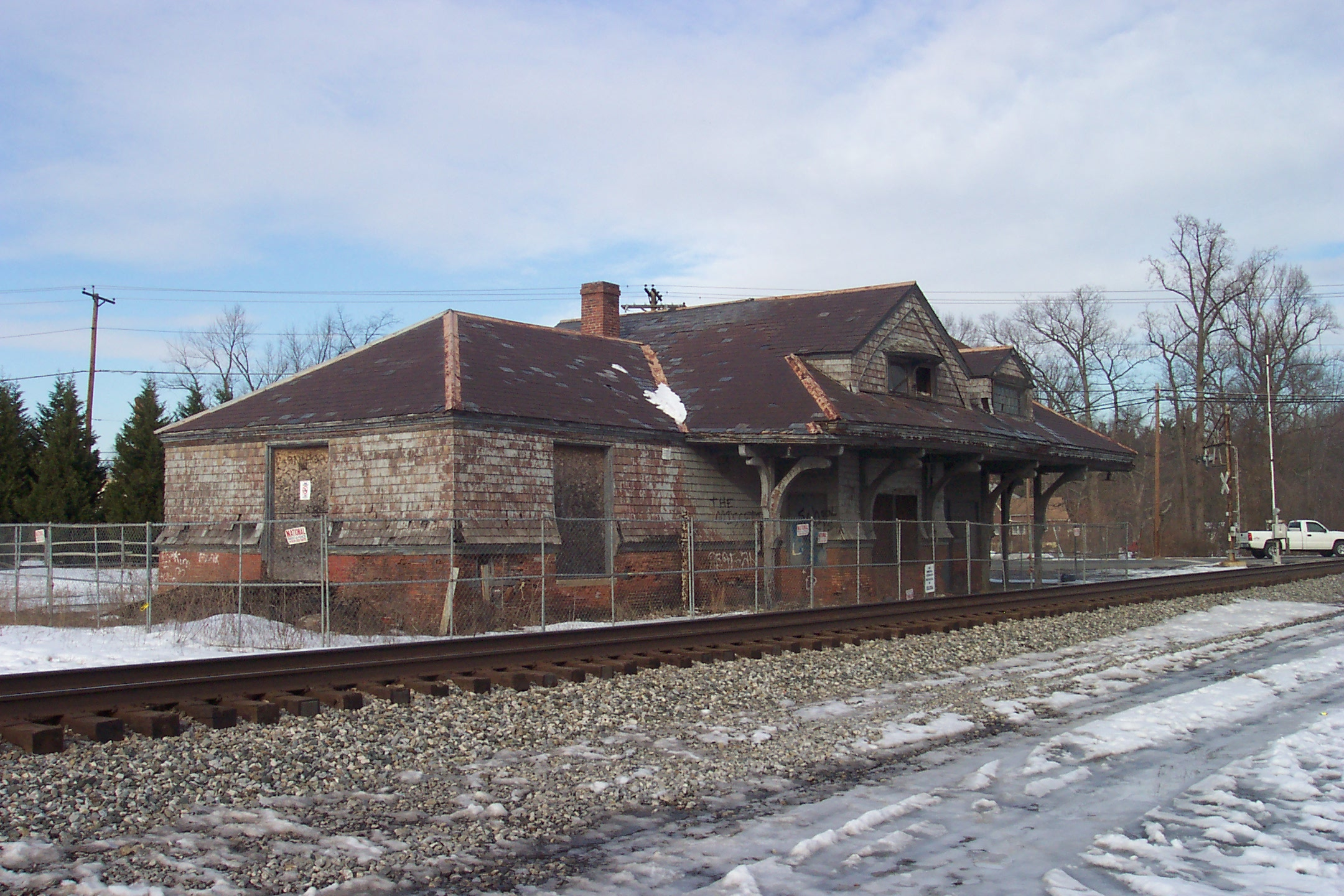
- Aberdeen station in 2011

General information
- Location: 408 West Bel Air Avenue (MD 132); Aberdeen, Maryland
- Coordinates: 39.511203°N 76.16983°W
- Owner: Track: CSX Transportation
- Line: Philadelphia Branch
- Tracks: 1 (formerly 2)

Construction
- Structure type: at-grade
- Parking: yes

History
- Opened: 1885
- Closed: 1955 or 1958

Former services
Preceding station	Baltimore and Ohio Railroad	Following station
Baltimore Mount Royal toward Chicago	Main Line	Wilmington (B&O) toward Jersey City
Stepney toward Chicago	Main Line	Swan Creek toward Jersey City
Location

Aberdeen station is a former Baltimore and Ohio Railroad (B&O) station in Aberdeen, Maryland. The station was designed by architect Frank Furness, who designed some 40 stations for the B&O in Delaware, Maryland, and Pennsylvania. The station has deteriorated in condition mightily since B&O ended service in 1955, and was almost torn down in 2003. An eleventh hour agreement was made by CSX and the Historical Society of Harford County to save the building. The station was transferred from the Historical Society of Harford County to the Aberdeen Historical Museum in 2016.

== Station house ==
Aberdeen station was built in a Queen Anne style of architecture. It is located on the west side of the single tracked (formerly double tracked) CSX Philadelphia Subdivision, and south of Bel Air Avenue (Maryland Route 132). The building is one-and-a-half stories tall, and was described as the type of station where the agent would live above the waiting room. The building is also the last wooden station remaining on the Baltimore–Philadelphia line, and one of the few stations Frank Furness designed that is still standing. The same plan was used to build the B&O's Cowenton station, which was demolished.

== History ==
The first B&O service to Aberdeen used the Philadelphia, Wilmington and Baltimore Railroad (PW&B) between Baltimore and New York City, now a part of Amtrak's Northeast Corridor. Rival Pennsylvania Railroad (PRR) began using the PW&B after opening its line between Washington, D.C. and Baltimore. This caused a power struggle between the B&O and the PRR.
