= German submarine U-36 =

U-36 may refer to one of the following German submarines:

- SM U-36, was a Type U 31 submarine launched in 1914 and that served in the First World War until sunk on 24 July 1915
  - During the First World War, Germany also had these submarines with similar names:
    - SM UB-36, a Type UB II submarine launched in 1915 and sunk on 9 May 1917
    - SM UC-36, a Type UC II submarine launched in 1916 and sunk on 21 May 1917
- German submarine U-36 (1936), a Type VIIA submarine that served in the Second World War until sunk on 4 December 1939
- German submarine U-36 (S186), a Type 212 submarine of the Bundesmarine commissioned into service in late 2015.
