= Strachan and Brown =

Strachan and Brown were an English coach building partnership and then a limited liability company from 1894 to 1974. The firm was originally founded in 1894 by Walter Ernest Brown as a sole trader. In 1896 S A Hughes joined and it became a partnership known as Brown and Hughes. In 1908 James Marshall Strachan joined the partnership with it being renamed Brown, Hughes and Strachan. In the partnership was put into liquidation in 1915. A new partnership with Strachan and Brown was formed that same year and lasted until 1928.

== Coach building ==
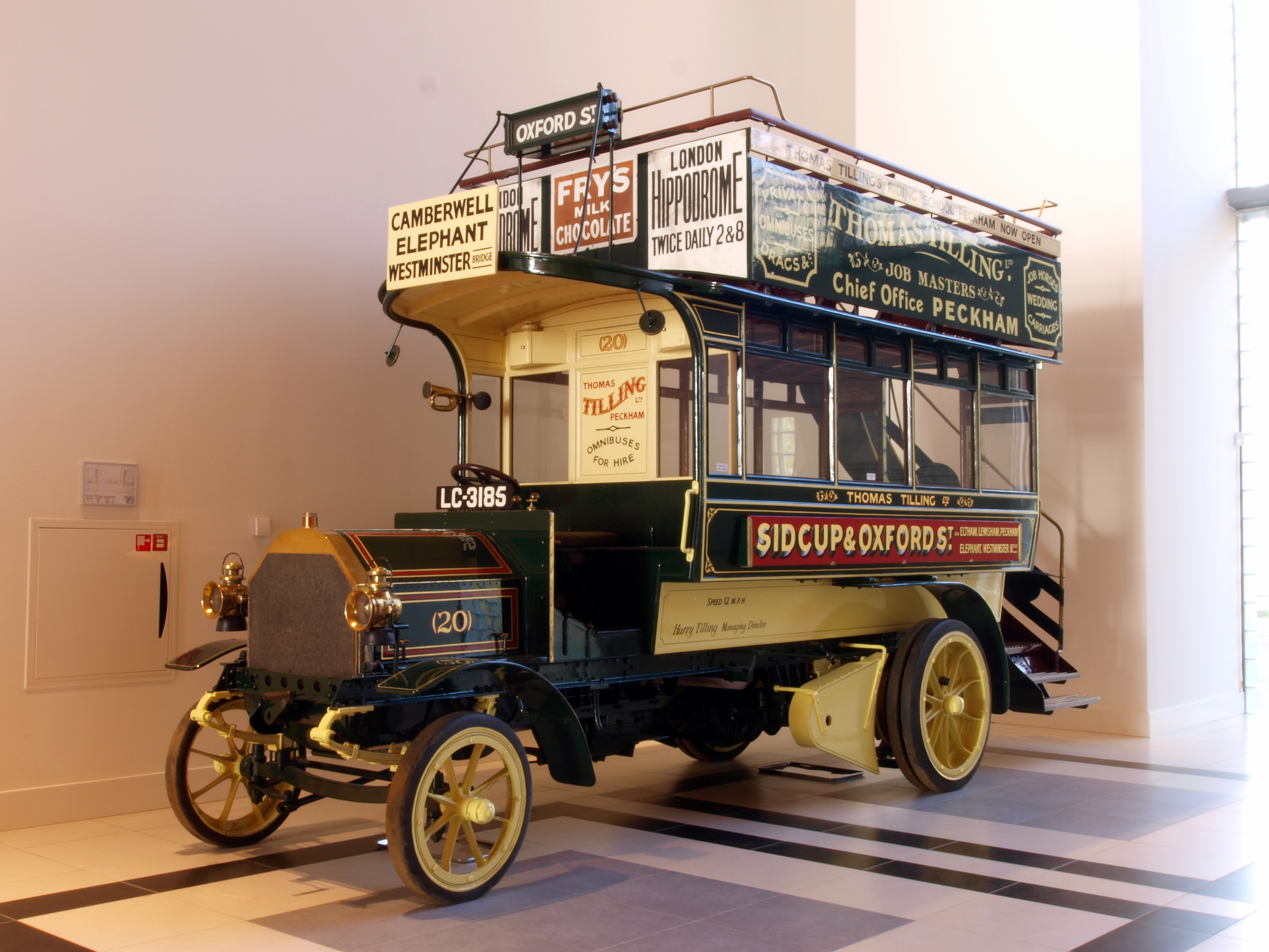
1904 Milnes-Daimler omnibus

The partnership was first involved with the repair and construction of horse drawn coaches. In 1903 the partnership built bodies for Milnes-Daimler buses. Their work included the first fully enclosed double-decker bus in the United Kingdom in 1909. The partnership also made bodies for various coach built car brands such as those from Lanchester Motor Company and Delaunay-Belleville. It continued its coach building until 1928 using Albion Motors chassis.

== Aberdonia ==
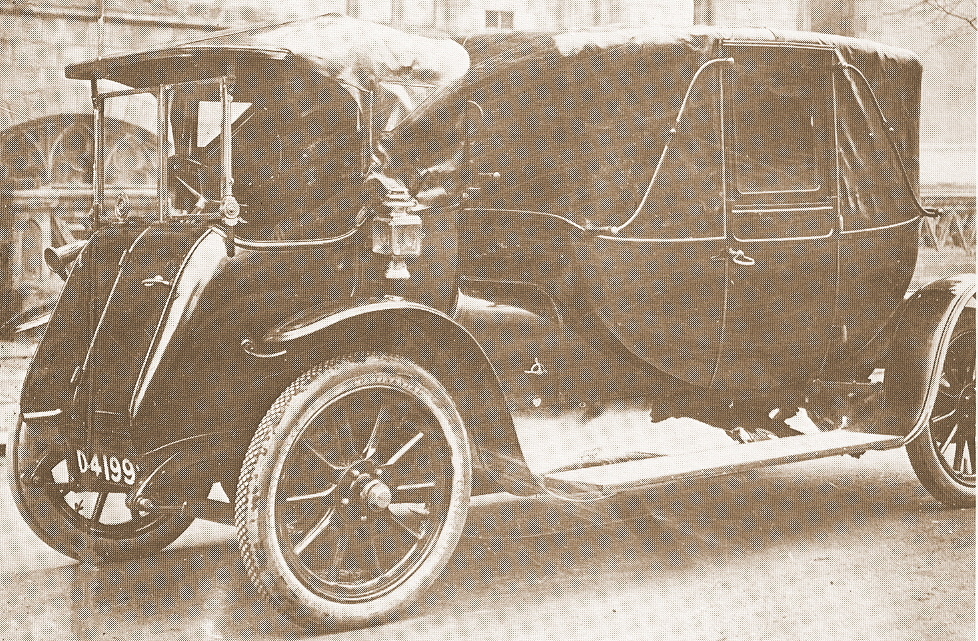
Aberdonia Park Royal

From 1911 to 1915 Strachen made a mid-engined car under the Aberdonia Cars Limited called the Park Royal. The prototype was displayed at the 1911 London Motor Show. It was forward-control with the driver seated ahead of the engine. The car was manufactured in Park Royal, London from 1911 to 1915 by the coachbuilders Brown, Hughes and Strachan. It was powered by a 3160 cc, 4-cylinder, side valve unit rated at 20 hp for taxation purposes. It cost £500 with seven-seated touring coachwork, or £700 with "special landau body". One was made in 1913 for an Indian Maharajah. Aberdonia also made a two seat cabriolet.

A prototype stretcher carrier, using the Aberdonia chassis, was made in September 1914 with the outbreak of World War One. Production then moved to primarily making ambulances. It also made vehicles with mobile washing and bathing facilities and field kitchens. In order to meet the war time demand Brown, Hughes & Strachan left its traditional facilities in Kensington at the end of 1914 and moved into a new 12,000 m² (3 acres ) site in the London district of Park Royal.

== Fire ==
In April 1915, the new facilities were completely destroyed by fire. Brown, Hughes & Strachan was then forced to cease operations and was liquidated in 1916. A fresh partnership was set up by Strachan and Brown after the fire to continue the business at their old premises in Holland Gate, Kensington, London.

== Aircraft ==
The company built aircraft at some point during and after the war.

== Patents ==
Strachen is noted as having patented a window that could be removed from the body work without disturbing it, an all weather roof for open top buses, and sprung bodywork to dampen vibrations from the chassis.

== Strachan and Brown ==
In 1923 the partnership moved to Wales Farm Road, Acton, London. They continued to supply bodies for luxury saloons, and bodies designed by Frank Hopper and Sons of Glasgow for combined passenger, mail, and goods vehicles that used a W&G chassis. These were able to carry 14 passengers and were targeted at rural communities. Bodies were also built for BET companies, the Barnsley and District Traction Co Ltd, and Sheppey Motor Transport Company. In 1925 they made a 26 coach body on a Lancia Pentajota chassis for A E Strachan of Ballater. In 1928 the partnership was dissolved on 17 October 1928 with Strachan passing away the following year on 10 June 1929.

== Strachans (Acton) Limited ==
On 2 October 1929 a new company was registered to take over the business of Strachan and Brown. This company continued coachbuilding. In June 1931 John Thornycroft and Co sent five of its new XC double decker chassis to Strachans for bodying. These were for the Eastern National Omnibus Company and were 51 seaters. These were followed by the Gilford Zeus double decker which also were 51 seaters.

== Strachans (Successors) Limited ==
The company was reorganised and renamed in 1934 but continued coachbuilding made four bodies on Lion chassis for the Metropolitan Omnibus Company of Perth, Australia. During World War 2 Strachans made a mobile kitchen for the National Fire Service and a Guy Arab chassised utility bus body.

Following the war, in conjunction with S Grahame Ross Ltd, Strachans developed a less complicated way of fabrication enabling interchangeability of panels by lower skilled workers. This construction was used on 15 lowbridge Leyland double deckers for the Western SMT Company. In 1951 they made a reversible design coach Jackson's Cleveland Coaches of Guisborough. An unpopular design on four more were made for Valiant Coaches of London. This was followed in 1952 by a body for the 41 seater Dennis Lancet.

That same year Strachans introduced the 41 seater Srathrae body, which was first used on a AEC Regal IV chassis. Two years later they introduced the Everest. Two were displayed at the 1954 Commercial Motor Show. One used a Maudslay chassis and the other an AEC Reliance chassis. Both were 41 seaters.

Through this time Strachans also produced other types of commercial and specialist vehicles included bulk egg transporters and milk tankers.

== Strachans (Coachbuilders) Limited ==
By 1962 the amount of business had reduced and the company was acquired by Giltspur Investment Group. They changed its name to Strachans (Coachbuilders) Limited and reorganised it. Production was moved to new facilities in Hamble on 1 October 1963. The new company made bodies for five Leyland Leopard for West Harlepool Corporation Transport and four double-deckers on AEC Regent V (3) and Leyland PD2 (1) chassis for Ayrshire Bus Owners Group. The Pacesetter and Pacesaver bodies were introduced in 1964. The smaller Pacetraveller, Pacemaker, and Pacerider models were introduced in later years. Strachans also built a variety of other specialised bodies including battery electric milk floats, personnel carriers for UNICEF, platform wagons for British Road Services, and double decker racing car carrier.

== Superior Coach Corporation ==
In 1969 Strachans obtained the rights from the Superior Coach Company of Lima, Ohio to manufacture, assemble, and distribute Superior bus bodies in Europe. Strachans were also given exclusive global rights to modify the bus bodies from eight foot wide to seven foot six inches. This resulted in them receiving an order of 100 CKD bodies from Ghana and a later order from the Bahrain Petroleum Company.

== Demise ==
In the early 70's sales had fallen and this, coupled with a strike in 1973, led to the parent company closing the factory down in mid 1974.
