= Aberdeen, South Africa =

Aberdeen
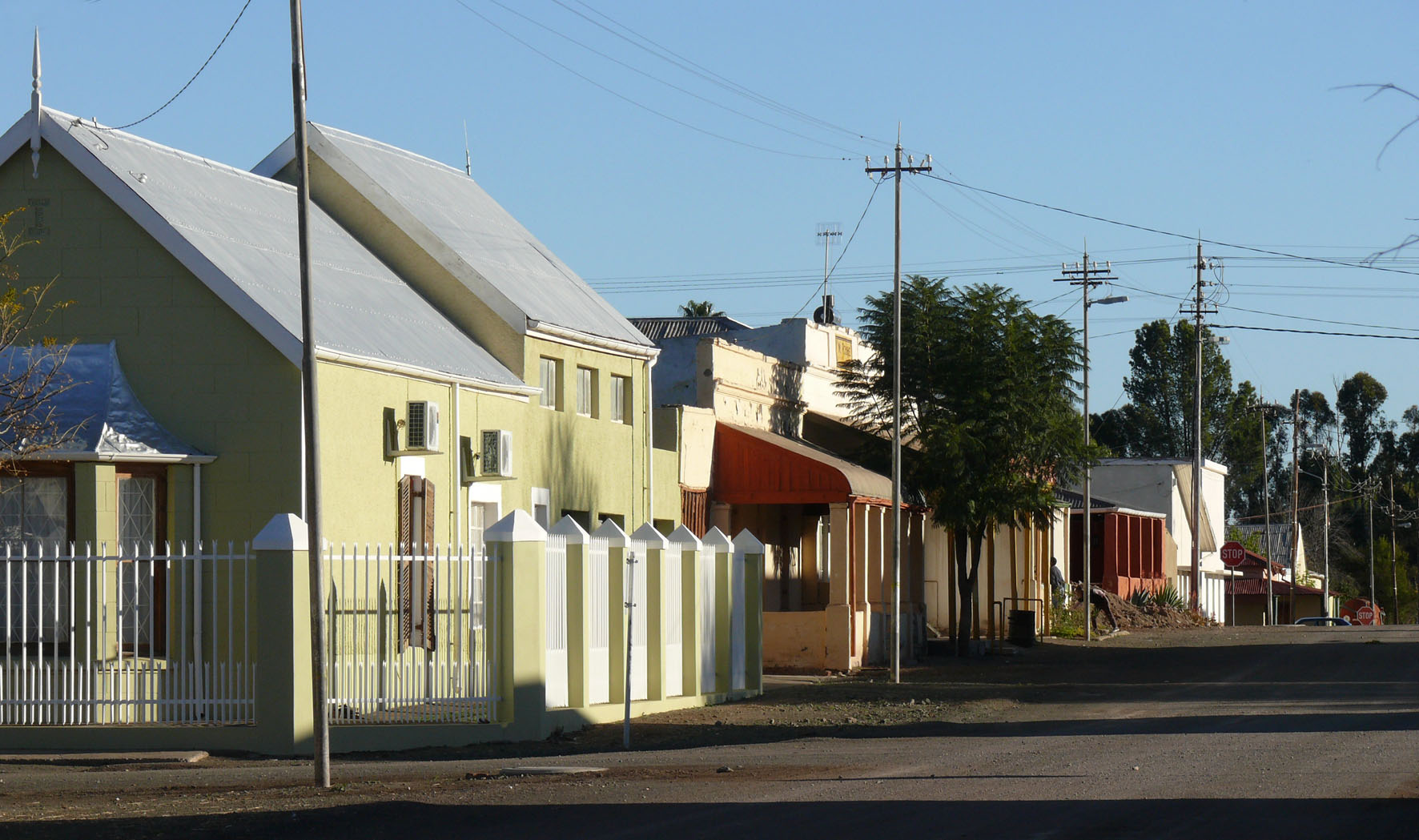
- Street in Aberdeen

- Location within Eastern Cape Location within South Africa
- Coordinates: 32°29′S 24°4′E
- Country: South Africa
- Province: Eastern Cape
- District: Sarah Baartman
- Municipality: Dr Beyers Naudé
- Established: 1856

Area
  - Total: 15.4 km^{2} (5.9 sq mi)

Population (2011)
  - Total: 7,162
  - Density: 465/km^{2} (1,200/sq mi)

Racial makeup (2011)
  - Black African: 19.4%
  - Coloured: 73.0%
  - Indian/Asian: 0.4%
  - White: 6.7%
  - Other: 0.4%

First languages (2011)
  - Afrikaans: 80.7%
  - Xhosa: 15.5%
  - English: 2.2%
  - Other: 1.6%
- Time zone: UTC+2 (SAST)
- Postal code (street): 6270
- PO box: 6270
- Area code: 049

Aberdeen, officially renamed Xamdeboo in February 2026, is a small town in the Sarah Baartman District Municipality of the Eastern Cape province of South Africa. With its numerous examples of Victorian architecture, it is one of the architectural conservation areas of the Karoo.

Aberdeen lies some 55 km south-west of Graaff-Reinet, 155 km east-south-east of Beaufort West and 32 km south of the Camdeboo Mountains. Laid out on the farm Brakkefontein as a settlement of the Dutch Reformed Church in 1856 (now the NGK), it became a municipality in 1858. It is named after the Scottish city of Aberdeen.

In 2023, it was proposed for Aberdeen to be renamed to Camdeboo. In 2024, this was rejected by the Minister of Sport, Arts and Culture, Gayton McKenzie. In 2026, a name with a slight difference in spelling (Xamdeboo) was officially approved by the minister in January, with the name change taking place in February.

== History ==
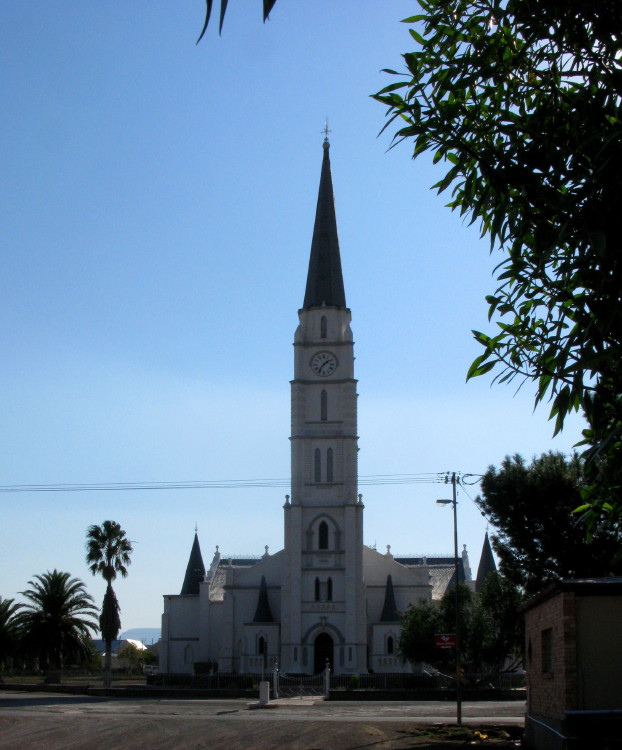
Dutch Reformed Church in Aberdeen

Aberdeen began as one of six congregations established in 1855 in what was then the Cape Colony, and the penultimate of the year. (Note: Jansenville, also in the Eastern Province, was first on 4 February, Ceres was second on 21 March, Sutherland third, then Aberdeen, Heidelberg fifth and Simon's Town sixth.)

On 10 September 1855, the church council of the NG congregation of Graaff-Reinet, the oldest congregation in the Eastern Cape, considered a request for the separation of a new congregation in the vicinity of where Aberdeen would later be established. Like many towns in the former Capeland, Aberdeen was founded as a church town. On 16 October, the Presbytery of Graaff-Reinet, the so-called third precinct (after Cape Town and Swellendam), formally separated the congregation during a session at Cradock. The Brakkefontein farm was selected as the location for the town and church. Reverend Andrew Murray Sr. (Note: father of the better known minister Andrew Murray) was appointed as a consultant. The farm, owned by Jan Vorster, was purchased for £4,875, and on 16 October 1855 the Presbytery signed the congregation's establishment. The locality's name was changed from Brakkefontein to Aberdeen, after Murray’s birthplace in Scotland. (The following year, the town and congregation of Murraysburg were also named in his honor.)

Lots were surveyed and sold, while the church council retained control over the town land and the right to levy the inheritance tax. Nearly a century after its founding, in 1949, as was the case with Steytlerville (another Eastern Cape church town), the church council transferred all its rights to the town council, which had been established in 1858. From this arose the later municipality.

A small church building was erected, but the town grew very slowly. On 21 January 1856 a man named Swarts was appointed as the first reader, sexton and schoolmaster of the town at a salary of £50 per year. After years of unsuccessful searches for a minister, the congregation's first minister, Reverend Thomas Menzies Gray, accepted his post on 21 September 1862.

Ministers of the Dutch Reformed Church in Aberdeen:

- Thomas Menzies Gray, 1862 - 1886 (emeritus; returned to Scotland)
- Daniël Hendrik Cilliers, 1887 - 1917 (emeritus; his only congregation; died on 21 January 1925)
- Abraham Faure Louw, 1917 - 1920
- Jacobus Joubert Krige, 1948 - 14 March 1970 (emeritus)
- Frederik Simon Vivier, 1971 - 2003 (accepts his emeritus)
- Jury Hendrik Wessels, 2003 - 2007
- Abraham Jacobus Beyers, 2007 - 28 February 2022 (emeritus)

== Education ==
Schools in Aberdeen are the Aberdeen Senior Secondary School, Luxolo intermediate School, Camdeboo Primary, and the Aberdeen Primary School

== Healthcare ==
The Aberdeen Provincial Hospital is situated in Aberdeen.

== Notable people ==
- Oswald Pirow (1890–1959), lawyer and far-right politician
- Conan Doyle (1913–1942), cricketer
- Anaso Jobodwana, athlete

== Bibliography ==
- Olivier, ds. P.L. (samesteller), Ons gemeentelike feesalbum. Kaapstad en Pretoria: N.G. Kerk-uitgewers, 1952.
