= Aberdeen Gardens, Washington =

- CDP
- Location of Aberdeen Gardens, Washington
- Coordinates: 47°4′21″N 123°46′14″W
- Country: United States
- State: Washington
- County: Grays Harbor

Area
  - Total: 1.62 sq mi (4.19 km^{2})
  - Land: 1.62 sq mi (4.19 km^{2})
  - Water: 0 sq mi (0.0 km^{2})
- Elevation: 16 ft (4.9 m)

Population (2020)
  - Total: 279
  - Density: 172/sq mi (66.6/km^{2})
- Time zone: UTC-8 (Pacific (PST))
  - Summer (DST): UTC-7 (PDT)
- ZIP Code: 98520
- Area code(s): 360, 564
- FIPS code: 53-00135
- GNIS feature ID: 2407691

Aberdeen Gardens is a census-designated place (CDP) in Grays Harbor County, Washington, United States. As of the 2020 census, Aberdeen Gardens had a population of 279.

== Geography ==
Aberdeen Gardens is located about 8 miles north of the city of Aberdeen.

According to the United States Census Bureau, the CDP has a total area of 1.62 square miles (4.19 km^{2}), all of it land.

== Demographics ==
Historical population
Census	Pop.	Note	%±
2000	227		—
2010	279		22.9%
2020	279		0.0%
U.S. Decennial Census; 1970 1980 1990; 2000 2010

Aberdeen Gardens first appeared as a census designated place in the 2000 U.S. census.

=== Racial and ethnic composition ===
Aberdeen Gardens CDP, Washington – Racial and ethnic composition Note: the US Census treats Hispanic/Latino as an ethnic category. This table excludes Latinos from the racial categories and assigns them to a separate category. Hispanics/Latinos may be of any race.
Race / Ethnicity (NH = Non-Hispanic)	Pop 2000	Pop 2010	Pop 2020	% 2000	% 2010	% 2020
White alone (NH)	219	250	241	96.48%	89.61%	86.38%
Black or African American alone (NH)	0	0	1	0.00%	0.00%	0.36%
Native American or Alaska Native alone (NH)	3	2	4	1.32%	0.72%	1.43%
Asian alone (NH)	0	6	2	0.00%	2.15%	0.72%
Native Hawaiian or Pacific Islander alone (NH)	0	0	2	0.00%	0.00%	0.72%
Other race alone (NH)	0	0	3	0.00%	0.00%	1.08%
Mixed race or Multiracial (NH)	1	7	13	0.44%	2.51%	4.66%
Hispanic or Latino (any race)	4	14	13	1.76%	5.02%	4.66%
Total	227	279	279	100.00%	100.00%	100.00%

=== 2010 census ===
At the 2010 census, there were 279 people, 114 households and 80 families residing in the CDP. The population density was 171.8 per square mile (66.6/km^{2}). There were 122 housing units at an average density of 75.3/sq mi (29.1/km^{2}). The racial makeup was 91.0% White, 1.8% Native American, 2.2% from other races, and 5.0% from two or more races. Hispanic or Latino of any race were 5.0% of the population.

There were 114 households, of which 32.5% had children under the age of 18 living with them, 55.3% were married couples living together, 10.5% had a female householder with no husband present, and 29.8% were non-families. 27.2% of all households were made up of individuals, and 8.8% had someone living alone who was 65 years of age or older. The average household size was 2.45 and the average family size was 2.98.

21.1% of the population were under the age of 18, 8.2% from 18 to 24, 20.4% from 25 to 44, 38.0% from 45 to 64, and 12.2% who were 65 years of age or older. The median age was 45.1 years. For every 100 females, there were 99.3 males. For every 100 females age 18 and over, there were 103.7 males.

At the time of the 2000 census, the median household income was $38,403 and the median family income was $38,819. Males had a median income of $38,333 and females $16,364. The per capita income was $17,341. About 10.1% of families and 7.5% of the population were below the poverty line, including none of those under the age of eighteen and 4.3% of those 65 or over.

== Education ==
Over half of the area is in the Aberdeen School District. The remainder is in the Wishkah Valley School District.
