= Aberdeen School District (Washington) =

School district in Washington, United States

Aberdeen School District No. 5

Location
- Grays Harbor County, Washington United States
- Coordinates: 46°58′42″N 123°48′59″W

District information
- Type: Public school district
- Grades: Pre K–12
- NCES District ID: 5300030

Other information
- Website: www.asd5.org

Aberdeen School District No. 5 is a public school district in Grays Harbor County, Washington, United States, and serves the city of Aberdeen, covering almost all of its area, as well as almost all of Central Park and over half of Aberdeen Gardens.

In May 2013, the district had an enrollment of 3,246.

== Schools ==
=== High schools ===
- Aberdeen High School (J. M. Weatherwax High School)
- (Harbor High School Now Known as Harbor Learning Center)

=== Junior high schools ===
- Miller Junior High School

=== Elementary schools ===
- (Formally Alexander Young Elementary School)
- A. J. West Elementary School
- Central Park Elementary School
- McDermoth Elementary School
- Robert Gray Elementary School
- Stevens Elementary School

=== Special schools and programs ===
- Hopkins Preschool
