= New Aberdeen, Nova Scotia =

Community in Nova Scotia, Canada

New Aberdeen in Nova Scotia

New Aberdeen (named after Aberdeen in Scotland) is a community that is part of the former town of Glace Bay in the Canadian province of Nova Scotia, located in the Cape Breton Regional Municipality on Cape Breton Island.

== History ==
The neighborhood was developed in the late part of the 19th and early part of the 20th century to house the workforce for the Number 20 (Also referred to as Dominion Number 2) coal mine (located near West Avenue).

The mines in and around Glace Bay were then owned by the Dominion Coal Company (DOMCO), incorporated February 1, 1893 Dominion Steel and Coal Corporation. After 1893, DOMCO re-apportioned its coal leases in the area. As a result, all coal in the Phalen coal seam below 150 meters was to be "set aside to be mined by a new deep shaft mine, Number 2", also known as Number "20". As the result of the development of the Dominion Number 2 colliery for this purpose, a series of company houses was built in the immediately vicinity southwest and southeast of the mine site near the turn of the 20th century.
