= Aberdeen station (Minneapolis and St. Louis Railway) =

Aberdeen
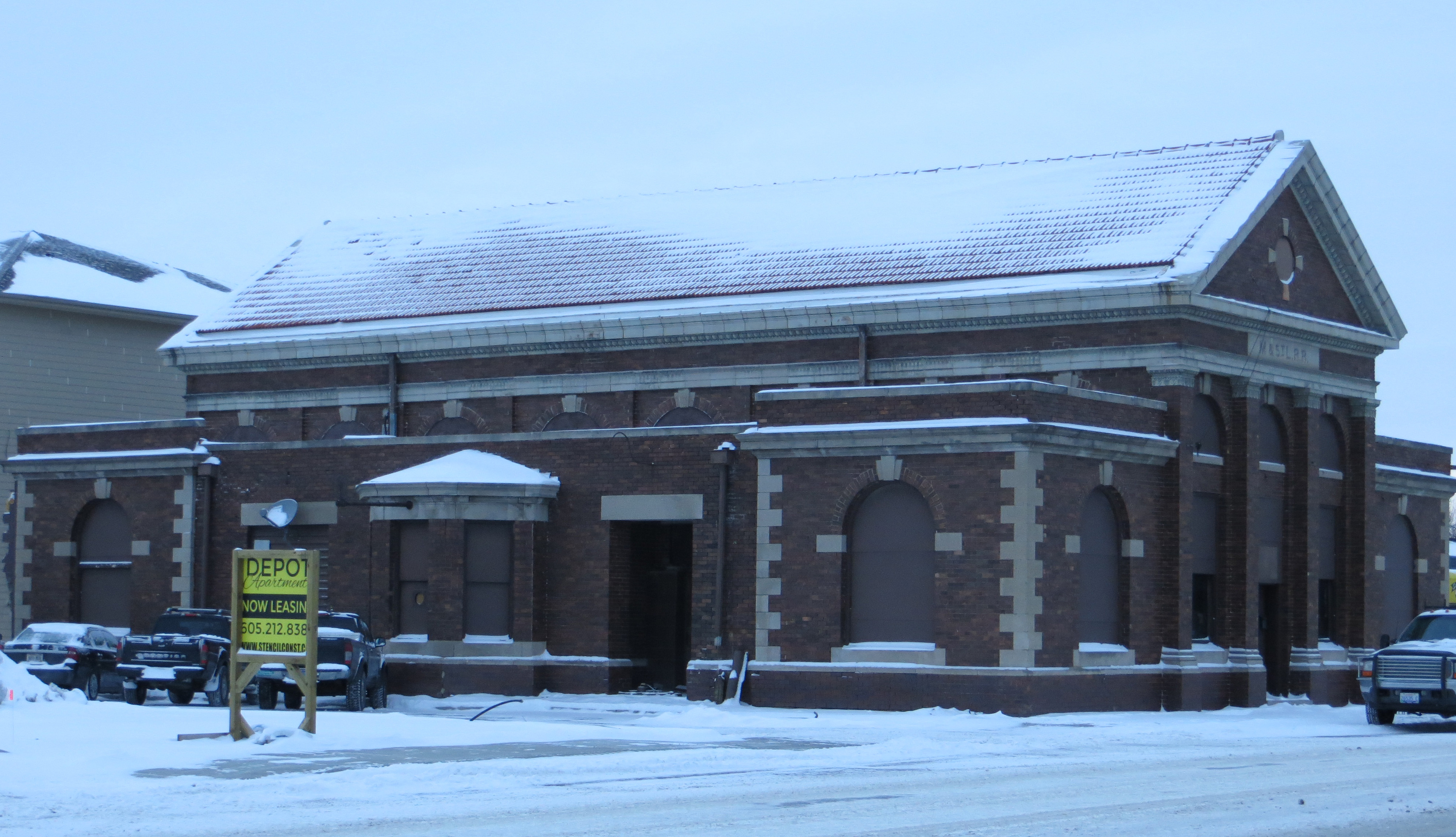
- Aberdeen station in January 2015.

General information
- Location: 1100 S. Main St, Aberdeen, South Dakota 57041
- Coordinates: 45°27′14″N 98°29′17″W
- System: Former Minneapolis & St. Louis Railway passenger rail station

History
- Opened: September 1, 1907
- Closed: 1949
- Rebuilt: 2016
- Minneapolis and St. Louis Railroad Depot
- U.S. National Register of Historic Places
- Location within South Dakota Location within the United States
- Location: 1100 S. Main St; Aberdeen, South Dakota
- Coordinates: 45°27′14″N 98°29′17″W
- Built: September 1, 1907
- Architectural style: Neo-Classical Revival
- NRHP reference No.: 76001720
- Added to NRHP: September 28, 1976
Location

Aberdeen station, otherwise known as the Minneapolis and St. Louis Railroad Depot in Aberdeen, South Dakota was built by the Minneapolis and St. Louis Railway (or M&StL) in the early 1900s and opened for service on September 1, 1907.

The depot is a one and one-half story rectangular brick building with a one story bay window on the south wall.

The Minneapolis and St. Louis Railroad began laying tracks into Aberdeen in 1906, and the first passenger train, the Aberdeen Limited, arrived on September 1, 1907. Passenger service to the station lasted until 1949. In 1968, the old station became the Depot Club. In 2016, the station was renovated and became an architecture office.
