= Aberdeen Municipal Airport =

Airport in Idaho, United States of America

- IATA: none; ICAO: none; FAA LID: U36

Summary
- Airport type: Public
- Owner: City of Aberdeen
- Serves: Aberdeen, Idaho
- Elevation AMSL: 4,470 ft (1,360 m)
- Coordinates: 42°55′16″N 112°52′51″W
- Interactive map of Aberdeen Municipal Airport

Runways
Direction	Length		Surface
Direction	ft	m	Surface
7/25	3,690	1,113	Asphalt

Statistics (2009)
- Aircraft operations: 8,000
- Based aircraft: 8
- Source: Federal Aviation Administration

Aberdeen Municipal Airport (FAA LID: U36) is a city-owned public-use airport located two nautical miles (3.7 km) southwest of the central business district of Aberdeen, a city in Bingham County, Idaho, United States. According to the FAA's National Plan of Integrated Airport Systems for 2009–2013, it is categorized as a general aviation facility.

== Facilities and aircraft ==
Aberdeen Municipal Airport covers an area of 44 acres (18 ha) at an elevation of 4,470 feet (1,362 m) above mean sea level. It has one runway designated 7/25 with an asphalt surface measuring 3,690 by 50 feet (1,113 x 15 m).

For the 12-month period ending April 7, 2009, the airport had 8,000 general aviation aircraft operations, an average of 21 per day. At that time there were 8 aircraft based at this airport: 75% single-engine and 25% multi-engine.

== See also ==
- List of airports in Idaho
