= Aberdeen, Idaho =

City in Bingham County, Idaho, United States

- City
- Location of Aberdeen in Bingham County, Idaho
- Coordinates: 42°56′39″N 112°50′18″W
- Country: United States
- State: Idaho
- County: Bingham
- Incorporated: 1907

Government
  - Mayor: Larry Barrett

Area
  - Total: 1.03 sq mi (2.67 km^{2})
  - Land: 1.03 sq mi (2.67 km^{2})
  - Water: 0 sq mi (0.00 km^{2})
- Elevation: 4,403 ft (1,342 m)

Population (2020)
  - Total: 1,756
  - Estimate (2022): 1,832
  - Density: 1,780/sq mi (687/km^{2})
- Time zone: UTC–7 (Mountain (MST))
  - Summer (DST): UTC–6 (MDT)
- ZIP Code: 83210
- Area codes: 208 and 986
- FIPS code: 16-00100
- GNIS feature ID: 2409654
- Website: aberdeenidaho.us

Aberdeen is a city in Bingham County, Idaho, United States. The population was 1,756 at the 2020 census. The community was named after Aberdeen, in Scotland.

== Geography ==
According to the United States Census Bureau, the city has a total area of 1.03 square miles (2.67 km^{2}), all of it land.

=== Climate ===
Aberdeen has a semi-arid steppe climate (BSk) according to the Köppen climate classification system. The hottest temperature recorded in Aberdeen was 104 °F (40.0 °C) on July 21, 1931, July 28, 1934, and July 23, 2006, while the coldest temperature recorded was −42 °F (−41.1 °C) on January 19, 1922.

Climate data for Aberdeen, Idaho, 1991–2020 normals, extremes 1914–present
Month	Jan	Feb	Mar	Apr	May	Jun	Jul	Aug	Sep	Oct	Nov	Dec	Year
Record high °F (°C)	56 (13)	63 (17)	76 (24)	86 (30)	96 (36)	103 (39)	104 (40)	103 (39)	100 (38)	89 (32)	73 (23)	67 (19)	104 (40)
Mean maximum °F (°C)	45.2 (7.3)	50.2 (10.1)	64.9 (18.3)	76.5 (24.7)	84.6 (29.2)	91.9 (33.3)	97.8 (36.6)	97.3 (36.3)	91.1 (32.8)	79.5 (26.4)	62.8 (17.1)	49.7 (9.8)	99.0 (37.2)
Mean daily maximum °F (°C)	32.2 (0.1)	37.2 (2.9)	48.3 (9.1)	57.9 (14.4)	67.7 (19.8)	76.9 (24.9)	87.1 (30.6)	86.8 (30.4)	76.4 (24.7)	61.2 (16.2)	45.1 (7.3)	33.2 (0.7)	59.2 (15.1)
Daily mean °F (°C)	23.0 (−5.0)	27.3 (−2.6)	36.9 (2.7)	44.3 (6.8)	53.8 (12.1)	61.4 (16.3)	69.1 (20.6)	67.7 (19.8)	58.4 (14.7)	45.8 (7.7)	33.4 (0.8)	23.8 (−4.6)	45.4 (7.4)
Mean daily minimum °F (°C)	13.8 (−10.1)	17.4 (−8.1)	25.6 (−3.6)	30.8 (−0.7)	39.8 (4.3)	45.8 (7.7)	51.1 (10.6)	48.7 (9.3)	40.4 (4.7)	30.4 (−0.9)	21.7 (−5.7)	14.5 (−9.7)	31.7 (−0.2)
Mean minimum °F (°C)	−7.1 (−21.7)	−1.6 (−18.7)	9.2 (−12.7)	17.7 (−7.9)	25.7 (−3.5)	32.9 (0.5)	40.3 (4.6)	37.1 (2.8)	27.3 (−2.6)	15.9 (−8.9)	3.5 (−15.8)	−6.3 (−21.3)	−12.5 (−24.7)
Record low °F (°C)	−42 (−41)	−38 (−39)	−22 (−30)	−7 (−22)	15 (−9)	22 (−6)	31 (−1)	29 (−2)	9 (−13)	−3 (−19)	−16 (−27)	−32 (−36)	−42 (−41)
Average precipitation inches (mm)	0.85 (22)	0.64 (16)	0.85 (22)	0.87 (22)	1.17 (30)	0.99 (25)	0.41 (10)	0.42 (11)	0.83 (21)	0.90 (23)	0.66 (17)	0.99 (25)	9.58 (244)
Average snowfall inches (cm)	7.7 (20)	5.1 (13)	1.8 (4.6)	0.5 (1.3)	0.1 (0.25)	0.0 (0.0)	0.0 (0.0)	0.0 (0.0)	0.0 (0.0)	0.5 (1.3)	2.0 (5.1)	7.5 (19)	25.2 (64.55)
Average precipitation days (≥ 0.01 in)	7.9	6.5	6.1	6.7	7.5	5.3	3.6	3.8	4.8	5.7	5.7	8.4	72.0
Average snowy days (≥ 0.1 in)	5.1	3.6	1.0	0.4	0.0	0.0	0.0	0.0	0.0	0.2	1.4	5.5	17.2
Source 1: NOAA
Source 2: National Weather Service

== Demographics ==
Historical population
Census	Pop.	Note	%±
1920	471		—
1930	646		37.2%
1940	1,016		57.3%
1950	1,486		46.3%
1960	1,484		−0.1%
1970	1,542		3.9%
1980	1,528		−0.9%
1990	1,406		−8.0%
2000	1,840		30.9%
2010	1,994		8.4%
2020	1,756		−11.9%
2022 (est.)	1,832		4.3%
U.S. Decennial Census; 2020 Census

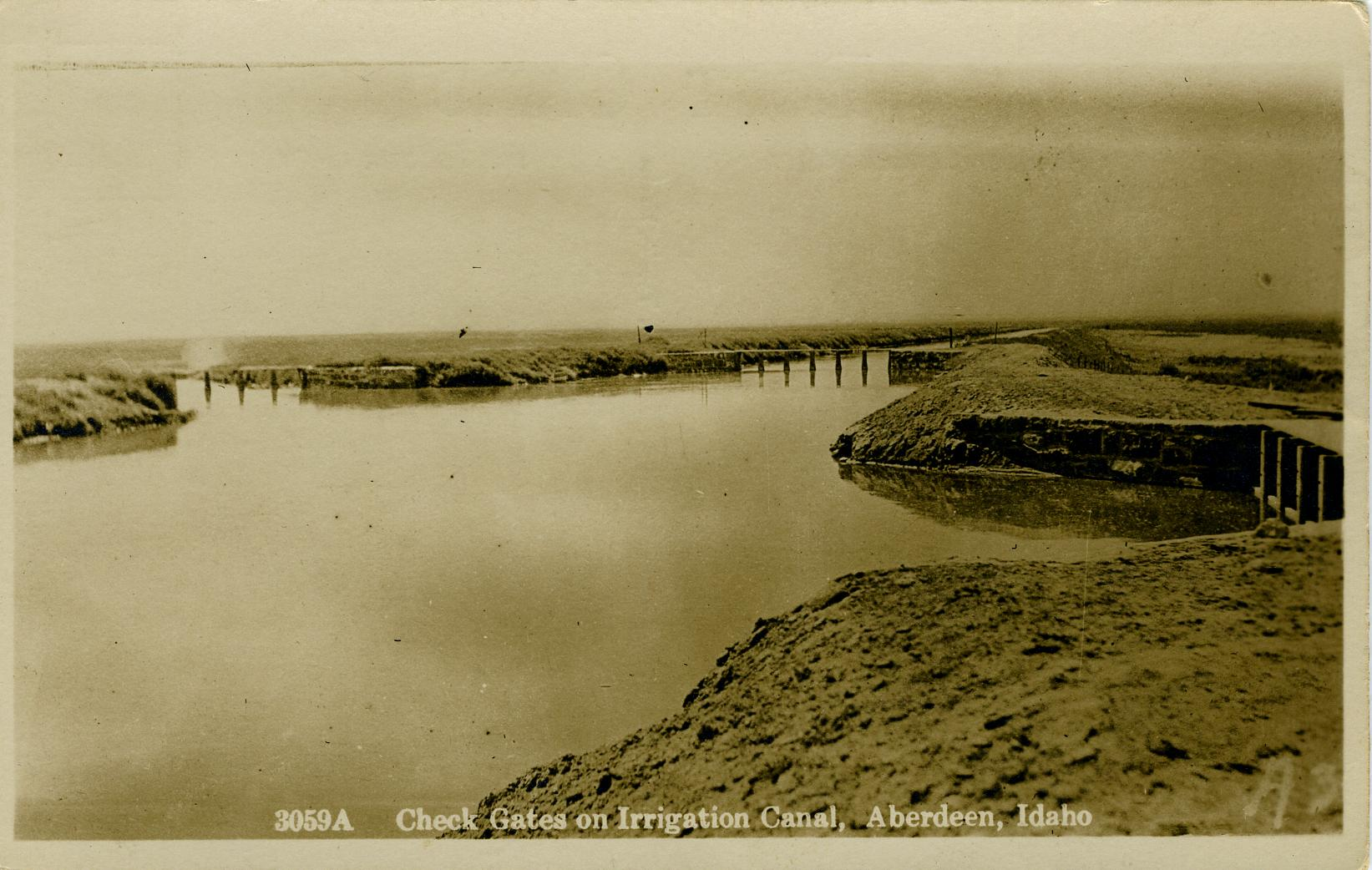
Irrigation canals in Aberdeen around 1920

=== 2020 census ===
As of the 2020 census, Aberdeen had a population of 1,756. The median age was 33.4 years. 31.9% of residents were under the age of 18 and 12.9% of residents were 65 years of age or older. For every 100 females there were 100.0 males, and for every 100 females age 18 and over there were 100.3 males age 18 and over.

0.0% of residents lived in urban areas, while 100.0% lived in rural areas.

There were 592 households in Aberdeen, of which 41.2% had children under the age of 18 living in them. Of all households, 56.3% were married-couple households, 19.6% were households with a male householder and no spouse or partner present, and 20.1% were households with a female householder and no spouse or partner present. About 23.5% of all households were made up of individuals and 13.4% had someone living alone who was 65 years of age or older.

There were 647 housing units, of which 8.5% were vacant. The homeowner vacancy rate was 2.0% and the rental vacancy rate was 4.1%.

Racial composition as of the 2020 census
Race	Number	Percent
White	696	39.6%
Black or African American	3	0.2%
American Indian and Alaska Native	29	1.7%
Asian	3	0.2%
Native Hawaiian and Other Pacific Islander	0	0.0%
Some other race	791	45.0%
Two or more races	234	13.3%
Hispanic or Latino (of any race)	1,111	63.3%

=== 2010 census ===
As of the 2010 census, there were 1,994 people, 615 households, and 466 families residing in the city. The population density was 1,935.9 inhabitants per square mile (747.5/km^{2}). There were 667 housing units at an average density of 647.6 per square mile (250.0/km^{2}). The racial makeup of the city was 60.2% White, 0.1% African American, 0.7% Native American, 0.1% Asian, 37.5% from other races, and 1.5% from two or more races. Hispanic or Latino of any race were 54.1% of the population.

There were 615 households, of which 49.6% had children under the age of 18 living with them, 59.0% were married couples living together, 10.6% had a female householder with no husband present, 6.2% had a male householder with no wife present, and 24.2% were non-families. 20.0% of all households were made up of individuals, and 10.7% had someone living alone who was 65 years of age or older. The average household size was 3.24 and the average family size was 3.79.

The median age in the city was 28.1 years. 37.2% of residents were under the age of 18; 8.7% were between the ages of 18 and 24; 24.2% were from 25 to 44; 19.8% were from 45 to 64; and 10.1% were 65 years of age or older. The gender makeup of the city was 50.6% male and 49.4% female.

=== 2000 census ===
As of the 2000 census, there were 1,840 people, 603 households, and 435 families residing in the city. The population density was 1,807.9 inhabitants per square mile (698.0/km^{2}). There were 654 housing units at an average density of 642.6 per square mile (248.1/km^{2}). The racial makeup of the city was 66.30% White, 0.11% African American, 0.71% Native American, 0.33% Asian, 0.05% Pacific Islander, 28.91% from other races, and 3.59% from two or more races. Hispanic or Latino of any race were 39.29% of the population.

There were 603 households, out of which 41.0% had children under the age of 18 living with them, 60.7% were married couples living together, 7.5% had a female householder with no husband present, and 27.7% were non-families. 26.7% of all households were made up of individuals, and 14.6% had someone living alone who was 65 years of age or older. The average household size was 3.05 and the average family size was 3.75.

In the city, the population was spread out, with 38.3% under the age of 18, 7.2% from 18 to 24, 25.4% from 25 to 44, 17.1% from 45 to 64, and 12.0% who were 65 years of age or older. The median age was 29 years. For every 100 females, there were 95.7 males. For every 100 females age 18 and over, there were 96.2 males.

The median income for a household in the city was $28,625, and the median income for a family was $31,393. Males had a median income of $27,537 versus $19,531 for females. The per capita income for the city was $10,907. About 14.9% of families and 20.5% of the population were below the poverty line, including 27.0% of those under age 18 and 14.2% of those age 65 or over.

== Education ==
Aberdeen Public Schools are part of the Aberdeen School District #58. Schools located in the district include Aberdeen Elementary School, Aberdeen Middle School and Aberdeen High School.

The University of Idaho's Aberdeen Research and Extension Center is located near the town.

C.J. Ward is the Superintendent of Schools.

== Transportation ==
=== Airport ===
Aberdeen Municipal Airport is a city-owned public-use airport located two nautical miles (3.7 km) southwest of the central business district of Aberdeen.

== See also ==
- List of cities in Idaho
