= 1977 NCAA Division I basketball championship game =

1977 NCAA Tournament Championship Game
National championship game
| North Carolina Tar Heels | Marquette Warriors |
| ACC | Independent |
| (28–4) | (23–7) |
|---|---|
| 59 | 67 |
| Head coach: Dean Smith | Head coach: Al McGuire |
- AP: 5
- Coaches: 3
- AP: 7
- Coaches: 14
| | 1st half | 2nd half | Total |
|---|---|---|---|
| North Carolina Tar Heels | 27 | 32 | 59 |
| Marquette Warriors | 39 | 28 | 67 |
- Date: March 28, 1977
- Venue: The Omni, Atlanta, Georgia
- Referees: Reggie Copeland & Paul Galvan
- Attendance: 16,086

United States TV coverage
- Network: NBC
- Announcers: Curt Gowdy, Dick Enberg, and Billy Packer

The 1977 NCAA Division I Basketball Championship Game took place on March 28, 1977, between the North Carolina Tar Heels and the Marquette Warriors at The Omni in Atlanta, Georgia. The matchup was the final one of the thirty-ninth consecutive NCAA Division I Men's Basketball Championship single-elimination tournament — commonly referred to as the NCAA Tournament — organized by the National Collegiate Athletic Association (NCAA) and is used to crown a national champion for men's basketball at the Division I level.

== Box score ==
NBC

March 28, 1977

#7 Marquette Warriors 67, #5 North Carolina Tar Heels 59
Scoring by half: 39–27, 28–32
| Pts: Butch Lee – 19; Rebs: Jerome Whitehead – 11; Asts: Bo Ellis – 3 | Pts: Walter Davis – 20; Rebs: Mike O'Koren – 11; Asts: John Kuester – 6 |

The Omni
Atlanta, Georgia
Attendance: 16,086
Referees: Reggie Copeland & Paul Galvan
