= 1976–77 North Carolina Tar Heels men's basketball team =

American college basketball season

1976–77 North Carolina Tar Heels men's basketball

NCAA tournament, runner-up ACC Tournament Champions ACC Regular Season Champions

National Championship Game, L 59-67 vs. Marquette
- Conference: Atlantic Coast Conference

Ranking
- Coaches: No. 3
- AP: No. 5
- Record: 28–5 (9–3 ACC)
- Head coach: Dean Smith (16th season)
- Assistant coaches: Bill Guthridge (10th season); Eddie Fogler (6th season)
- Home arena: Carmichael Auditorium

1976–77 ACC men's basketball standings
	Conf.				Overall
Team	W		L	PCT	W		L	PCT
No. 5 North Carolina†	9	–	3	.750	28	–	5	.848
No. 9 Wake Forest	8	–	4	.667	22	–	8	.733
Clemson	8	–	4	.667	22	–	6	.786
Maryland	7	–	5	.583	19	–	8	.704
NC State	6	–	6	.500	17	–	11	.607
Virginia	2	–	10	.167	12	–	17	.414
Duke	2	–	10	.167	14	–	13	.519
† 1977 ACC tournament winner Rankings from AP Poll

The 1976–77 North Carolina Tar Heels men's basketball team represented the University of North Carolina at Chapel Hill in the 1976–77 NCAA Division I men's basketball season. The Tar Heels were coached by Dean Smith in his 16th season at North Carolina. They played their home games in Carmichael Auditorium as members of the Atlantic Coast Conference. They finished the season 28–5, 9–3 in ACC play to win the ACC regular season championship. They defeated NC State and Virginia to win the ACC Tournament. As a result, the received the conference's automatic bid to the NCAA tournament. There, they defeated Purdue, Notre Dame, and Kentucky to advance to the Final Four. At the Final Four, they defeated UNLV before losing to Marquette in the National Championship game.

== Schedule and results ==
Date time, TV	Rank^{#}	Opponent^{#}	Result	Record	Site city, state
Regular season
November 26*	No. 3	vs. No. 15 NC State; Big Four Tournament/Rivalry	W 78–66	1–0	Greensboro Coliseum; Greensboro, NC
November 27*	No. 3	vs. Wake Forest; Big Four Tournament	L 96–97 ^{OT}	1–1	Greensboro Coliseum; Greensboro, NC
December 1*	No. 9	Marshall	W 90–70	2–1	Carmichael Auditorium; Chapel Hill, NC
December 6*	No. 9	at Michigan State	W 81–58	3–1	Jenison Fieldhouse; East Lansing, MI
December 11*	No. 12	vs. Virginia Tech	W 81–77	4–1	Carmichael Auditorium; Roanoke, VA
December 20*	No. 20	BYU	W 113–93	5–1	Carmichael Auditorium; Chapel Hill, NC
December 27*	No. 10	vs. Oral Roberts; Far West Classic quarterfinals	W 100–84	6–1	Veterans Memorial Coliseum; Portland, OR
December 29*	No. 9	vs. Oregon; Far West Classic semifinals	W 86–60	7–1	Veterans Memorial Coliseum; Portland, OR
December 30*	No. 9	vs. Weber State; Far West Classic championship	W 75–54	8–1	Veterans Memorial Coliseum; Portland, OR
January 5	No. 6	vs. No. 16 Clemson	W 91–63	9–1 (1–0)	Greensboro Coliseum; Greensboro, NC
January 8	No. 6	Virginia	W 91–67	10–1 (2–0)	Carmichael Auditorium; Chapel Hill, NC
January 13	No. 5	at No. 7 Wake Forest	W 77–75	11–1 (3–0)	Winston-Salem Memorial Coliseum; Winston-Salem, NC
January 15	No. 5	Duke; Rivalry	W 77–68	12–1 (4–0)	Carmichael Auditorium; Chapel Hill, NC
January 19	No. 4	at NC State	L 73–75	12–2 (4–1)	Reynolds Coliseum; Raleigh, NC
January 22	No. 4	at No. 13 Maryland	W 71–68	13–2 (5–1)	Cole Field House; College Park, MD
January 26	No. 4	No. 10 Wake Forest	L 66–67	13–3 (5–2)	Carmichael Auditorium; Chapel Hill, NC
January 29	No. 4	at No. 19 Clemson	L 73–93	13–4 (5–3)	Littlejohn Coliseum; Clemson, SC
February 4*	No. 13	vs. Georgia Tech; North-South Doubleheader	W 98–74	14–4	Charlotte Coliseum; Charlotte, NC
February 5*	No. 13	vs. Furman; North-South Doubleheader	W 88–71	15–4	Charlotte Coliseum; Charlotte, NC
February 9	No. 14	Maryland	W 97–70	16–4 (6–3)	Carmichael Auditorium; Chapel Hill, NC
February 12*	No. 14	vs. Tulane	W 106–94	17–4	Greensboro Coliseum; Greensboro, NC
February 16*	No. 13	South Florida	W 100–65	18–4	Carmichael Auditorium; Chapel Hill, NC
February 20	No. 13	at Virginia	W 66–64	19–4 (7–3)	University Hall; Charlottesville, VA
February 23	No. 9	NC State	W 90–73	20–4 (8–3)	Carmichael Auditorium; Chapel Hill, NC
February 26	No. 9	at Duke; Rivalry	W 84–71	21–4 (9–3)	Cameron Indoor Stadium; Durham, NC
February 27*	No. 9	vs. No. 10 Louisville	W 96–89	22–4	Charlotte Coliseum; Chapel Hill, NC
ACC Tournament
March 4*	No. 5	vs. NC State; Semifinals	W 70–56	23–4	Greensboro Coliseum; Greensboro, NC
March 5*	No. 6	vs. Virginia; Championship	W 75–69	24–4	Greensboro Coliseum; Greensboro, NC
NCAA Tournament
March 12*	No. 4	vs. Purdue; First round	W 69–66	25–4	Reynolds Coliseum; Raleigh, NC
March 17*	No. 5	vs. No. 10 Notre Dame; Regional semifinal	W 79–77	26–4	Cole Field House; College Park, MD
March 19*	No. 5	vs. No. 3 Kentucky; Regional final	W 79–72	27–4	Cole Field House; College Park, MD
March 26*	No. 5	vs. No. 4 UNLV; Final Four	W 84–83	28–4	The Omni (16,086); Atlanta, GA
March 28*; 8:15 p.m., NBC	No. 5	vs. No. 7 Marquette; National Championship	L 59–67	28–5	The Omni (16,086); Atlanta, GA
*Non-conference game. ^{#}Rankings from AP poll. (#) Tournament seedings in parentheses. All times are in Eastern Time.

== Roster ==
1976–77 North Carolina Tar Heels men's basketball team
Players
Coaches

Pos.	#	Name	Height	Weight	Year	Hometown
F	22	Dudley Bradley	6 ft 5 in (1.96 m)	195 lb (88 kg)	So	Edgewood, Maryland
F	40	Bruce Buckley (C)	6 ft 8 in (2.03 m)	180 lb (82 kg)	Sr	Bladensburg, Maryland
G	20	Dave Colescott	6 ft 1 in (1.85 m)	175 lb (79 kg)	Fr	Marion, Indiana
F	30	Woody Coley (C)	6 ft 6 in (1.98 m)	—	Sr	Lumberton, North Carolina
F	24	Walter Davis (C)	6 ft 5 in (1.96 m)	190 lb (86 kg)	Sr	Pineville, North Carolina
G	23	Ged Doughton	6 ft 0 in (1.83 m)	162 lb (73 kg)	So	Winston-Salem, North Carolina
G	12	Phil Ford	6 ft 2 in (1.88 m)	170 lb (77 kg)	Jr	Rocky Mount, North Carolina
F/C	54	Steve Krafcisin	6 ft 9 in (2.06 m)	225 lb (102 kg)	Fr	Chicago Ridge, Illinois
G	15	John Kuester (C)	6 ft 2 in (1.88 m)	170 lb (77 kg)	Sr	Richmond, Virginia
F/C	45	Tommy LaGarde (C)	6 ft 10 in (2.08 m)	230 lb (104 kg)	Sr	Detroit, Michigan
G/F	31	Mike O'Koren	6 ft 6 in (1.98 m)	205 lb (93 kg)	Fr	Jersey City, New Jersey
G	43	John Virgil	6 ft 4 in (1.93 m)	175 lb (79 kg)	Fr	Elm City, North Carolina
F	25	Randy Wiel	6 ft 4 in (1.93 m)	195 lb (88 kg)	So	Curaçao, Netherlands Antilles
C	42	Jeff Wolf	6 ft 10 in (2.08 m)	210 lb (95 kg)	Fr	Kohler, Wisconsin
F/C	50	Rich Yonakor	6 ft 9 in (2.06 m)	205 lb (93 kg)	Fr	Euclid, Ohio
G/F	32	Tom Zagliagiris	6 ft 5 in (1.96 m)	190 lb (86 kg)	Jr	Livonia, Michigan

Head coach

- Dean Smith

Assistant coach(es)

- Bill Guthridge
- Eddie Fogler

Legend

- (C) Team captain
- (S) Suspended
- (I) Ineligible
- (W) Walk-on
- Injured
- Current redshirt
