= 1976–77 Duke Blue Devils men's basketball team =

American college basketball season

1976–77 Duke Blue Devils men's basketball
- Conference: Atlantic Coast Conference
- Record: 14–13 (2–10 ACC)
- Head coach: Bill Foster
- Home arena: Cameron Indoor Stadium; Durham, North Carolina

1976–77 ACC men's basketball standings
	Conf.				Overall
Team	W		L	PCT	W		L	PCT
No. 5 North Carolina†	9	–	3	.750	28	–	5	.848
No. 9 Wake Forest	8	–	4	.667	22	–	8	.733
Clemson	8	–	4	.667	22	–	6	.786
Maryland	7	–	5	.583	19	–	8	.704
NC State	6	–	6	.500	17	–	11	.607
Virginia	2	–	10	.167	12	–	17	.414
Duke	2	–	10	.167	14	–	13	.519
† 1977 ACC tournament winner Rankings from AP Poll

The 1976–77 Duke Blue Devils men's basketball team represented Duke University in the 1976–77 NCAA Division I men's basketball season. The head coach was Bill Foster and the team finished the season with an overall record of 14–13 and did not qualify for the NCAA tournament.

== Schedule ==
Date time, TV	Rank^{#}	Opponent^{#}	Result	Record	Site city, state
November 26, 1976		vs. Wake Forest; Big Four Tournament	L 80–81	0–1	Greensboro Coliseum; Greensboro, N.C.
November 27, 1976		vs. No. 15 NC State; Big Four Tournament	W 84–82	1–1	Greensboro Coliseum; Greensboro, N.C.
November 30, 1976*		Johns Hopkins	W 85–66	2–1	Cameron Indoor Stadium; Durham, N.C.
December 4, 1976*		Washington	W 83–81	3–1	Cameron Indoor Stadium; Durham, N.C.
December 7, 1976*		at No. 15 Tennessee	W 81–78	4–1	Stokely Athletic Center; Knoxville, T.N.
December 11, 1976*		Richmond	W 65–63	5–1	Cameron Indoor Stadium; Durham, N.C.
December 14, 1976*		vs. Connecticut	W 64–62 ^{OT}	6–1	Madison Square Garden; New York, N.Y.
December 29, 1976*		vs. East Carolina; Holiday Doubleheader	W 88–65	7–1	Reynolds Coliseum; Raleigh, N.C.
December 30, 1976*		vs. Rice; Holiday Doubleheader	W 87–77	8–1	Reynolds Coliseum; Raleigh, N.C.
January 5, 1977*		at Davidson	W 102–51	9–1	
January 10, 1977*		Lafayette	W 93–77	10–1	Cameron Indoor Stadium; Durham, N.C.
January 12, 1977		No. 17 Clemson	L 73–80 ^{OT}	10–2	Cameron Indoor Stadium; Durham, N.C.
January 15, 1977		at No. 5 North Carolina; Rivalry	L 68–77	10–3	Carmichael Auditorium; Chapel Hill, N.C.
January 17, 1977		at Virginia	W 82–74 ^{OT}	11–3	University Hall; Charlottesville, V.A.
January 19, 1977		at No. 9 Wake Forest	L 73–85	11–4	Winston-Salem Memorial Coliseum; Winston-Salem, N.C.
January 22, 1977		NC State	L 78–79	11–5	Cameron Indoor Stadium; Durham, N.C.
January 29, 1977		at West Virginia	L 65–70	11–6	WVU Coliseum; Morgantown, W.V.
January 31, 1977*		at Duquesne	W 76–49	12–6	Civic Arena; Pittsburg, P.A.
February 2, 1977		No. 5 Wake Forest	L 80–89	12–7	Cameron Indoor Stadium; Durham, N.C.
February 5, 1977		Maryland	L 64–65 ^{OT}	12–8	Cameron Indoor Stadium; Durham, N.C.
February 9, 1977		Virginia	W 65–49	13–8	Cameron Indoor Stadium; Durham, N.C.
February 12, 1977*		St. Joseph's	W 72–62	14–8	Cameron Indoor Stadium; Durham, N.C.
February 16, 1977		at No. 19 NC State	L 74–92	14–9	Reynolds Coliseum; Raleigh, N.C.
February 19, 1977		at Maryland	L 72–85	14–10	Cole Field House; College Park, M.D.
February 23, 1977		at No. 19 Clemson	L 63–67	14–11	Littlejohn Coliseum; Clemson, S.C.
February 26, 1977		No. 9 North Carolina; Rivalry	L 71–84	14–12	Cameron Indoor Stadium; Durham, N.C.
March 3, 1977	(6)	vs. (3) No. 18 Clemson; ACC tournament quarterfinals	L 74–82	14–13	Greensboro Coliseum; Greensboro, N.C.
*Non-conference game. ^{#}Rankings from AP Poll. (#) Tournament seedings in parentheses. All times are in Eastern Time. Source: Duke media guide
