= 1976–77 Marquette Warriors men's basketball team =

American college basketball season

1976–77 Marquette Warriors men's basketball

NCAA tournament National Champions

National Championship Game, W 67–59 vs. North Carolina
- Conference: Independent

Ranking
- Coaches: No. 14
- AP: No. 7
- Record: 25–7
- Head coach: Al McGuire
- Assistant coaches: Rick Majerus; Hank Raymonds
- Captain: Bo Ellis
- Home arena: MECCA Arena

1976–77 NCAA Division I men's basketball independents standings
	Conf.				Overall
Team	W		L	PCT	W		L	PCT
No. 4 UNLV		–		–	29	–	3	.906
Indiana State		–		–	25	–	3	.893
No. 6 Syracuse		–		–	26	–	4	.867
No. 12 Detroit		–		–	25	–	4	.862
Old Dominion		–		–	25	–	4	.862
Providence		–		–	24	–	5	.828
Holy Cross		–		–	23	–	6	.793
St. Bonaventure		–		–	23	–	6	.793
No. 7 Marquette		–		–	25	–	7	.781
North Texas State		–		–	21	–	6	.778
Illinois State		–		–	22	–	7	.759
No. 10 Notre Dame		–		–	22	–	7	.759
Creighton		–		–	21	–	7	.750
Oral Roberts		–		–	21	–	7	.750
Army		–		–	20	–	8	.714
St. John's		–		–	22	–	9	.710
Milwaukee		–		–	19	–	8	.704
Georgetown		–		–	19	–	9	.679
Virginia Tech		–		–	19	–	10	.655
James Madison		–		–	17	–	9	.654
Northwestern State		–		–	17	–	9	.654
Texas–Pan American		–		–	17	–	9	.654
Connecticut		–		–	17	–	10	.630
Seton Hall		–		–	18	–	11	.621
UNC Wilmington		–		–	16	–	10	.615
Portland State		–		–	16	–	10	.615
Iona		–		–	15	–	10	.600
Dayton		–		–	16	–	11	.593
Fairfield		–		–	16	–	11	.593
Georgia Southern		–		–	16	–	11	.593
Richmond		–		–	15	–	11	.577
Saint Francis (PA)		–		–	15	–	11	.577
DePaul		–		–	15	–	12	.556
Northeast Louisiana		–		–	15	–	12	.556
Stetson		–		–	15	–	12	.556
Utah State		–		–	15	–	12	.556
Colgate		–		–	13	–	11	.542
Navy		–		–	13	–	11	.542
Oklahoma City		–		–	14	–	12	.538
South Carolina		–		–	14	–	12	.538
Valparaiso		–		–	13	–	12	.520
Catholic		–		–	13	–	13	.500
Fairleigh Dickinson		–		–	13	–	13	.500
Loyola (IL)		–		–	13	–	13	.500
Maine		–		–	13	–	13	.500
Niagara		–		–	13	–	13	.500
Rhode Island		–		–	13	–	13	.500
Saint Peter's		–		–	13	–	13	.500
VCU		–		–	13	–	13	.500
Butler		–		–	13	–	14	.481
Manhattan		–		–	13	–	14	.481
New Hampshire		–		–	12	–	14	.462
Northeastern		–		–	12	–	14	.462
St. Francis (NY)		–		–	12	–	14	.462
Air Force		–		–	12	–	15	.444
Denver		–		–	12	–	15	.444
Southern Mississippi		–		–	11	–	16	.407
Siena		–		–	9	–	15	.375
Cleveland State		–		–	10	–	17	.370
Xavier		–		–	10	–	17	.370
Centenary (LA)		–		–	11	–	19	.367
Long Island		–		–	9	–	16	.360
Hawaii		–		–	9	–	18	.333
Western Carolina		–		–	8	–	16	.333
Vermont		–		–	8	–	17	.320
Boston College		–		–	8	–	18	.308
Baptist		–		–	8	–	19	.296
Marshall		–		–	8	–	19	.296
Boston University		–		–	7	–	19	.269
Robert Morris		–		–	7	–	19	.269
Samford		–		–	7	–	19	.269
Mercer		–		–	6	–	19	.240
Hardin–Simmons		–		–	6	–	21	.222
Houston Baptist		–		–	6	–	23	.207
Buffalo		–		–	5	–	21	.192
Fordham		–		–	5	–	21	.192
Wagner		–		–	3	–	21	.125
Canisius		–		–	3	–	22	.120
Rankings from AP Poll

The 1976–77 Marquette Warriors men's basketball team represented Marquette University in the 1976–77 NCAA Division I men's basketball season. The Warriors played their home games at the MECCA Arena in Milwaukee, Wisconsin as a Division I Independent.

They were led by head coach Al McGuire in his 13th and final year at Marquette. The Warriors finished the season 25–7. They received a bid to the NCAA tournament where they defeated Cincinnati, Kansas State, and Wake Forest to advance to the Final Four. At the Final Four, they defeated UNC Charlotte to advance to the National Championship game where they defeated North Carolina to win the National Championship.

Butch Lee, the tournament's most outstanding player, and Bo Ellis were the stars of a team that reflected the street-wise toughness of its coach. In the final AP poll released prior to the Sweet Sixteen, Marquette moved from sixteenth to seven in the rankings. Following the season, head coach Al McGuire retired.

Since this season, Marquette has returned to the Final Four only once, in 2003.

== Roster ==
1976–77 Marquette Warriors men's basketball team
Players
Coaches

Pos.	#	Name	Height	Weight	Year	Hometown
G	23	Jim Boylan	6 ft 2 in (1.88 m)	190 lb (86 kg)	Jr	Jersey City, New Jersey
C	30	Craig Butrym	6 ft 11 in (2.11 m)	185 lb (84 kg)	Sr	Fox Point, Wisconsin
F	43	Robert Byrd	6 ft 6 in (1.98 m)	185 lb (84 kg)	Fr	Chicago, Illinois
F	40	Jim Dudley	6 ft 6 in (1.98 m)	190 lb (86 kg)	So	South Milwaukee, Wisconsin
F	31	Bo Ellis	6 ft 9 in (2.06 m)	190 lb (86 kg)	Sr	Chicago, Illinois
G		Mark Lavin	6 ft 1 in (1.85 m)	155 lb (70 kg)	Fr	Palatine, Illinois
G	15	Butch Lee	6 ft 1 in (1.85 m)	185 lb (84 kg)	Jr	The Bronx, New York
F	42	Bill Neary	6 ft 5 in (1.96 m)	185 lb (84 kg)	Sr	Wauwatosa, Wisconsin
F	21	Ulice Payne	6 ft 6 in (1.98 m)	185 lb (84 kg)	Jr	Donora, Pennsylvania
G	55	Gary Rosenberger	6 ft 0 in (1.83 m)	155 lb (70 kg)	Jr	Milwaukee, Wisconsin
F	33	Bernard Toone	6 ft 9 in (2.06 m)	210 lb (95 kg)	So	Yonkers, New York
C	54	Jerome Whitehead	6 ft 10 in (2.08 m)	220 lb (100 kg)	Jr	Waukegan, Illinois

Head coach

- Al McGuire

Assistant coach(es)

- Hank Raymonds
- Rick Majerus

Legend

- (C) Team captain
- (S) Suspended
- (I) Ineligible
- (W) Walk-on
- Injured
- Current redshirt

== Schedule and results ==
Date time, TV	Rank^{#}	Opponent^{#}	Result	Record	High points	High rebounds	High assists	Site (attendance) city, state
Regular season
December 1	No. 2	St. Leo	W 80–39	1–0	17 – Ellis	10 – Toone	–	MECCA Arena (10,938); Milwaukee, WI
December 6	No. 2	Western Michigan	W 78–53	2–0	22 – Lee	11 – Ellis	–	MECCA Arena (10,938); Milwaukee, WI
December 8	No. 2	at Florida	W 64–61	3–0	19 – Lee	7 – Ellis	–	Florida Gymnasium (7,131); Gainesville, FL
December 11	No. 2	Penn State	W 79–49	4–0	18 – Lee	13 – Whitehead	–	MECCA Arena (10,938); Milwaukee, WI
December 18	No. 2	No. 17 Louisville	L 75–78 ^{OT}	4–1	30 – Lee	11 – Ellis	–	MECCA Arena (10,938); Milwaukee, WI
December 21	No. 6	No. 20 Minnesota	L 59–66	4–2	17 – Whitehead	12 – Whitehead	–	MECCA Arena (10,938); Milwaukee, WI
December 27	No. 6	No. 11 Clemson; Milwaukee Classic	W 67–49	5–2	17 – Lee	11 – Whitehead/Ellis	–	MECCA Arena (10,938); Milwaukee, WI
December 28	No. 12	Wisconsin; Milwaukee Classic	W 64–57	6–2	25 – Lee	7 – Whitehead	–	MECCA Arena (10,938); Milwaukee, WI
December 31	No. 12	at Northwestern	W 66–53	7–2	29 – Lee	8 – Ellis	–	McGaw Hall (4,321); Evanston, IL
January 3	No. 12	Georgia Tech	W 63–45	8–2	18 – Lee	10 – Whitehead	–	MECCA Arena (10,938); Milwaukee, WI
January 8	No. 12	South Carolina	W 65–54	9–2	18 – Lee	8 – Ellis	–	MECCA Arena (10,938); Milwaukee, WI
January 11	No. 11	at Air Force	W 74–56	10–2	33 – Lee	13 – Ellis	–	Clune Arena (5,400); Colorado Springs, CO
January 16	No. 11	No. 19 Notre Dame	W 78–69	11–2	27 – Lee	7 – Whitehead/Lee	–	MECCA Arena (10,938); Milwaukee, WI
January 18	No. 8	at Drake	W 62–60	12–2	19 – Lee	9 – Ellis	–	Veterans Auditorium (10,108); Des Moines, IA
January 22	No. 8	Xavier	W 85–43	13–2	17 – Ellis/Lee	11 – Ellis	–	MECCA Arena (10,938); Milwaukee, WI
January 29	No. 9	at DePaul	W 85–64	14–2	21 – Lee	7 – Ellis	–	Alumni Hall (5,448); Chicago, IL
February 6	No. 6	at No. 12 Cincinnati	L 62–63	14–3	19 – Lee	15 – Whitehead	–	Riverfront Coliseum (13,358); Cincinnati, OH
February 9	No. 9	Loyola (IL)	W 81–71	15–3	22 – Ellis/Lee	7 – Whitehead	–	MECCA Arena (10,938); Milwaukee, WI
February 12	No. 9	Manhattan	W 86–60	16–3	22 – Ellis	8 – Whitehead/Ellis	–	MECCA Arena (10,938); Milwaukee, WI
February 14	No. 9	DePaul	L 72–77 ^{2OT}	16–4	18 – Whitehead/Lee	13 – Whitehead	–	MECCA Arena (10,938); Milwaukee, WI
February 16	No. 9	No. 15 Detroit	L 63–64	16–5	21 – Ellis	9 – Whitehead	–	MECCA Arena (10,938); Milwaukee, WI
February 19	No. 9	Wichita State	L 64–75	16–6	15 – Lee	9 – Ellis	–	MECCA Arena (10,938); Milwaukee, WI
February 21	No. 9	at Wisconsin	W 73–58	17–6	25 – Lee	11 – Ellis	–	Wisconsin Field House (10,938); Madison, WI
February 26	No. 18	at Virginia Tech	W 75–70	18–6	22 – Lee	9 – Ellis	–	Cassell Coliseum (10,000); Blacksburg, VA
February 28	No. 18	at Tulane	W 63–44	19–6	26 – Ellis	13 – Ellis	–	Avron B. Fogelman Arena (8,250); New Orleans, LA
March 5	No. 19	at Creighton	W 72–60	20–6	18 – Lee	13 – Whitehead	–	Omaha Civic Auditorium (10,380); Omaha, NE
March 6	No. 19	at No. 3 Michigan	L 68–69	20–7	19 – Lee	9 – Ellis	–	Crisler Arena (13,609); Ann Arbor, MI
NCAA Tournament
March 12; 1:00 pm, NBC	No. 16	vs. No. 11 Cincinnati; First round	W 66–51	21–7	17 – Ellis	6 – Whitehead/Toone	–	Omaha Civic Auditorium (9,821); Omaha, NE
March 17; 7:00 pm, NBC	No. 7	vs. No. 16 Kansas State; Regional semifinal	W 67–66	22–7	26 – Lee	6 – Whitehead	–	The Myriad (10,185); Oklahoma City, OK
March 19; 1:15 pm, NBC	No. 7	vs. No. 9 Wake Forest; Regional Final	W 82–68	23–7	20 – Ellis	7 – Ellis	–	The Myriad (8,935); Oklahoma City, OK
March 26; 1:15 pm, NBC	No. 7	vs. No. 17 UNC-Charlotte; Final Four	W 51–49	24–7	21 – Whitehead	16 – Whitehead	–	The Omni (16,086); Atlanta, GA
March 28; 7:15 pm, NBC	No. 7	vs. No. 5 North Carolina; National Championship	W 67–59	25–7	19 – Lee	11 – Whitehead	–	The Omni (16,086); Atlanta, GA
*Non-conference game. ^{#}Rankings from AP Poll. (#) Tournament seedings in parentheses. All times are in Central Time.

== Awards and honors ==
- Butch Lee, NCAA Men's MOP Award

== Team players drafted into the NBA ==
1977 NBA draft

Round	Pick	Player	NBA club
1	17	Bo Ellis	Washington Bullets
