= 1976–77 Notre Dame Fighting Irish men's basketball team =

American college basketball season

1976–77 Notre Dame Fighting Irish men's basketball

NCAA Tournament, Sweet Sixteen
- Conference: Independent

Ranking
- AP: No. 10
- Record: 22–7
- Head coach: Digger Phelps
- Assistant coach: Danny Nee
- Home arena: Joyce Center

1976–77 NCAA Division I men's basketball independents standings
	Conf.				Overall
Team	W		L	PCT	W		L	PCT
No. 4 UNLV		–		–	29	–	3	.906
Indiana State		–		–	25	–	3	.893
No. 6 Syracuse		–		–	26	–	4	.867
No. 12 Detroit		–		–	25	–	4	.862
Old Dominion		–		–	25	–	4	.862
Providence		–		–	24	–	5	.828
Holy Cross		–		–	23	–	6	.793
St. Bonaventure		–		–	23	–	6	.793
No. 7 Marquette		–		–	25	–	7	.781
North Texas State		–		–	21	–	6	.778
Illinois State		–		–	22	–	7	.759
No. 10 Notre Dame		–		–	22	–	7	.759
Creighton		–		–	21	–	7	.750
Oral Roberts		–		–	21	–	7	.750
Army		–		–	20	–	8	.714
St. John's		–		–	22	–	9	.710
Milwaukee		–		–	19	–	8	.704
Georgetown		–		–	19	–	9	.679
Virginia Tech		–		–	19	–	10	.655
James Madison		–		–	17	–	9	.654
Northwestern State		–		–	17	–	9	.654
Texas–Pan American		–		–	17	–	9	.654
Connecticut		–		–	17	–	10	.630
Seton Hall		–		–	18	–	11	.621
UNC Wilmington		–		–	16	–	10	.615
Portland State		–		–	16	–	10	.615
Iona		–		–	15	–	10	.600
Dayton		–		–	16	–	11	.593
Fairfield		–		–	16	–	11	.593
Georgia Southern		–		–	16	–	11	.593
Richmond		–		–	15	–	11	.577
Saint Francis (PA)		–		–	15	–	11	.577
DePaul		–		–	15	–	12	.556
Northeast Louisiana		–		–	15	–	12	.556
Stetson		–		–	15	–	12	.556
Utah State		–		–	15	–	12	.556
Colgate		–		–	13	–	11	.542
Navy		–		–	13	–	11	.542
Oklahoma City		–		–	14	–	12	.538
South Carolina		–		–	14	–	12	.538
Valparaiso		–		–	13	–	12	.520
Catholic		–		–	13	–	13	.500
Fairleigh Dickinson		–		–	13	–	13	.500
Loyola (IL)		–		–	13	–	13	.500
Maine		–		–	13	–	13	.500
Niagara		–		–	13	–	13	.500
Rhode Island		–		–	13	–	13	.500
Saint Peter's		–		–	13	–	13	.500
VCU		–		–	13	–	13	.500
Butler		–		–	13	–	14	.481
Manhattan		–		–	13	–	14	.481
New Hampshire		–		–	12	–	14	.462
Northeastern		–		–	12	–	14	.462
St. Francis (NY)		–		–	12	–	14	.462
Air Force		–		–	12	–	15	.444
Denver		–		–	12	–	15	.444
Southern Mississippi		–		–	11	–	16	.407
Siena		–		–	9	–	15	.375
Cleveland State		–		–	10	–	17	.370
Xavier		–		–	10	–	17	.370
Centenary (LA)		–		–	11	–	19	.367
Long Island		–		–	9	–	16	.360
Hawaii		–		–	9	–	18	.333
Western Carolina		–		–	8	–	16	.333
Vermont		–		–	8	–	17	.320
Boston College		–		–	8	–	18	.308
Baptist		–		–	8	–	19	.296
Marshall		–		–	8	–	19	.296
Boston University		–		–	7	–	19	.269
Robert Morris		–		–	7	–	19	.269
Samford		–		–	7	–	19	.269
Mercer		–		–	6	–	19	.240
Hardin–Simmons		–		–	6	–	21	.222
Houston Baptist		–		–	6	–	23	.207
Buffalo		–		–	5	–	21	.192
Fordham		–		–	5	–	21	.192
Wagner		–		–	3	–	21	.125
Canisius		–		–	3	–	22	.120
Rankings from AP Poll

The 1976–77 Notre Dame Fighting Irish men's basketball team represented the University of Notre Dame during the 1976–77 NCAA men's basketball season.

== Roster ==
1976–77 Notre Dame Fighting Irish men's basketball team
Players
Coaches

Pos.	#	Name	Height	Weight	Year	Previous school	Hometown
F/C	45	Dave Batton	6 ft 9 in (2.06 m)	225 lb (102 kg)	Jr	Springfield	Springfield, PA
G	12	Rich Branning	6 ft 3 in (1.91 m)	160 lb (73 kg)	Fr	Marina	Huntington Beach, CA
G	10	Jeff Carpenter	6 ft 0 in (1.83 m)	165 lb (75 kg)	Jr	Fenwick	Oak Park, IL
G	24	Chris Fabian	6 ft 2 in (1.88 m)	195 lb (88 kg)	So	Haddonfield	Haddonfield, NJ
F/C	34	Bruce Flowers	6 ft 8 in (2.03 m)	210 lb (95 kg)	So	Berkley	Huntington Woods, MI
F	22	Randy Haefner	6 ft 6 in (1.98 m)	205 lb (93 kg)	Jr	McNicholas	Milford, OH
G/F	42	Bill Hanzlik	6 ft 7 in (2.01 m)	185 lb (84 kg)	Fr	Beloit	Beloit, WI
G	11	Tim Healy	6 ft 1 in (1.85 m)	170 lb (77 kg)	Fr	Cardinal Gibbons	Fort Lauderdale, FL
F/C	43	Toby Knight (C)	6 ft 9 in (2.06 m)	210 lb (95 kg)	Sr	Vandermeulen	Shoreham, NY
G	23	Dave Kuzmicz	6 ft 3 in (1.91 m)	185 lb (84 kg)	Sr	St. Joseph's	South Bend, IN
G	21	Ray Martin (C)	6 ft 1 in (1.85 m)	170 lb (77 kg)	Sr	Mater Christi	Long Island City, NY
F	55	Bill Paterno (C)	6 ft 6 in (1.98 m)	205 lb (93 kg)	Sr	Christian Brothers	Spring Lake, NJ
F	44	Bill Sahm	6 ft 2 in (1.88 m)	188 lb (85 kg)	Sr	Cathedral	Indianapolis, IN
G	25	Don Williams	6 ft 3 in (1.91 m)	180 lb (82 kg)	Jr	Mackin	Washington, D.C.

Head coach

- Digger Phelps

Assistant coach(es)

Legend

- (C) Team captain
- (S) Suspended
- (I) Ineligible
- (W) Walk-on
- Injured
- Current redshirt

Roster
Last update: 2015-Dec-25

== Schedule ==
Date time, TV	Rank^{#}	Opponent^{#}	Result	Record	Site city, state
November 27	No. 14	at No. 8 Maryland	W 80–79		Cole Field House; College Park, MD
December 1		Cal Poly	W 93–67		Joyce Center; South Bend, IN
December 4		Valparaiso	W 93–56		Joyce Center; South Bend, IN
December 7		Northwestern	W 105–78		Joyce Center; South Bend, IN
December 11	No. 7	at No. 3 UCLA	W 66–63		Pauley Pavilion (12,542); Los Angeles, CA
December 14	No. 4	No. 16 Indiana	W 78–65		Joyce Center; South Bend, IN
December 21		Vermont	W 89–48		Joyce Center; South Bend, IN
December 30	No. 2	vs. No. 6 Kentucky	L 78–102		Freedom Hall; Louisville, KY
January 3		at Princeton	L 62–76		Jadwin Gymnasium; Princeton, NJ
January 5		at Villanova	L 62–64		
January 16	No. 19	at No. 11 Marquette	L 69–78		MECCA Arena (10,938); Milwaukee, WI
January 18		Stonehill	W 98–70		Joyce Center; South Bend, IN
January 23		No. 10 UCLA	L 65–70		Joyce Center (11,345); South Bend, IN
January 26		Pittsburgh	W 88–68		Joyce Center; South Bend, IN
January 30		Fordham	W 93–71		Joyce Center; South Bend, IN
February 1		Dayton	W 97–64		Joyce Center; South Bend, IN
February 5		at Davidson	W 88–57		Charlotte, NC
February 7		Xavier	W 94–63		Joyce Center; South Bend, IN
February 9		Holy Cross	W 91–73		Joyce Center; South Bend, IN
February 12		South Carolina	W 84–66		Joyce Center; South Bend, IN
February 14		Butler	W 97–74		Joyce Center; South Bend, IN
February 17		vs. Manhattan	W 80–76		Madison Square Garden; New York, NY
February 19		at West Virginia	L 68–81		Morgantown, WV
February 23		Loyola (IL)	W 111–86		Chicago, IL
February 26		La Salle	W 113–77		Joyce Center; South Bend, IN
March 1		San Francisco	W 93–82		Joyce Center; South Bend, IN
March 5		at DePaul	W 76–68		
March 13	No. 10	vs. Hofstra; NCAA Tournament	W 90–83		
March 17	No. 10	vs. No. 5 North Carolina; NCAA Tournament – Regional semifinal	L 77–79		Cole Field House; College Park, MD
*Non-conference game. ^{#}Rankings from AP Poll. (#) Tournament seedings in parentheses. All times are in Eastern Time.
