= 1976–77 Connecticut Huskies men's basketball team =

American college basketball season

1976–77 Connecticut Huskies men's basketball
- Conference: Independent
- Record: 17–10
- Head coach: Dee Rowe (8th season)
- Assistant coaches: Dom Perno; Arthur A. Perry
- Home arena: Hugh S. Greer Field House; Hartford Civic Center

1976–77 NCAA Division I men's basketball independents standings
	Conf.				Overall
Team	W		L	PCT	W		L	PCT
No. 4 UNLV		–		–	29	–	3	.906
Indiana State		–		–	25	–	3	.893
No. 6 Syracuse		–		–	26	–	4	.867
No. 12 Detroit		–		–	25	–	4	.862
Old Dominion		–		–	25	–	4	.862
Providence		–		–	24	–	5	.828
Holy Cross		–		–	23	–	6	.793
St. Bonaventure		–		–	23	–	6	.793
No. 7 Marquette		–		–	25	–	7	.781
North Texas State		–		–	21	–	6	.778
Illinois State		–		–	22	–	7	.759
No. 10 Notre Dame		–		–	22	–	7	.759
Creighton		–		–	21	–	7	.750
Oral Roberts		–		–	21	–	7	.750
Army		–		–	20	–	8	.714
St. John's		–		–	22	–	9	.710
Milwaukee		–		–	19	–	8	.704
Georgetown		–		–	19	–	9	.679
Virginia Tech		–		–	19	–	10	.655
James Madison		–		–	17	–	9	.654
Northwestern State		–		–	17	–	9	.654
Texas–Pan American		–		–	17	–	9	.654
Connecticut		–		–	17	–	10	.630
Seton Hall		–		–	18	–	11	.621
UNC Wilmington		–		–	16	–	10	.615
Portland State		–		–	16	–	10	.615
Iona		–		–	15	–	10	.600
Dayton		–		–	16	–	11	.593
Fairfield		–		–	16	–	11	.593
Georgia Southern		–		–	16	–	11	.593
Richmond		–		–	15	–	11	.577
Saint Francis (PA)		–		–	15	–	11	.577
DePaul		–		–	15	–	12	.556
Northeast Louisiana		–		–	15	–	12	.556
Stetson		–		–	15	–	12	.556
Utah State		–		–	15	–	12	.556
Colgate		–		–	13	–	11	.542
Navy		–		–	13	–	11	.542
Oklahoma City		–		–	14	–	12	.538
South Carolina		–		–	14	–	12	.538
Valparaiso		–		–	13	–	12	.520
Catholic		–		–	13	–	13	.500
Fairleigh Dickinson		–		–	13	–	13	.500
Loyola (IL)		–		–	13	–	13	.500
Maine		–		–	13	–	13	.500
Niagara		–		–	13	–	13	.500
Rhode Island		–		–	13	–	13	.500
Saint Peter's		–		–	13	–	13	.500
VCU		–		–	13	–	13	.500
Butler		–		–	13	–	14	.481
Manhattan		–		–	13	–	14	.481
New Hampshire		–		–	12	–	14	.462
Northeastern		–		–	12	–	14	.462
St. Francis (NY)		–		–	12	–	14	.462
Air Force		–		–	12	–	15	.444
Denver		–		–	12	–	15	.444
Southern Mississippi		–		–	11	–	16	.407
Siena		–		–	9	–	15	.375
Cleveland State		–		–	10	–	17	.370
Xavier		–		–	10	–	17	.370
Centenary (LA)		–		–	11	–	19	.367
Long Island		–		–	9	–	16	.360
Hawaii		–		–	9	–	18	.333
Western Carolina		–		–	8	–	16	.333
Vermont		–		–	8	–	17	.320
Boston College		–		–	8	–	18	.308
Baptist		–		–	8	–	19	.296
Marshall		–		–	8	–	19	.296
Boston University		–		–	7	–	19	.269
Robert Morris		–		–	7	–	19	.269
Samford		–		–	7	–	19	.269
Mercer		–		–	6	–	19	.240
Hardin–Simmons		–		–	6	–	21	.222
Houston Baptist		–		–	6	–	23	.207
Buffalo		–		–	5	–	21	.192
Fordham		–		–	5	–	21	.192
Wagner		–		–	3	–	21	.125
Canisius		–		–	3	–	22	.120
Rankings from AP Poll

The 1976–77 Connecticut Huskies men's basketball team represented the University of Connecticut in the 1976–77 collegiate men's basketball season. The Huskies completed the season with a 17–10 overall record. The Huskies were an NCAA Division I Independent school for men's basketball this year, after the Yankee Conference became a football only conference. The Huskies played their home games at Hugh S. Greer Field House in Storrs, Connecticut and the Hartford Civic Center in Hartford, Connecticut, and were led by eighth-year head coach Dee Rowe.

== Schedule ==
Date time, TV	Rank^{#}	Opponent^{#}	Result	Record	Site (attendance) city, state
Regular season
12/1/1976*		Boston University	W 73–69 ^{OT}	1–0	Hugh S. Greer Field House; Storrs, Connecticut
12/4/1976*		at Yale	W 56–50	2–0	Payne Whitney Gymnasium; New Haven, Connecticut
12/7/1976*		at Columbia	L 71–72	2–1	Columbia, Missouri
12/11/1976*		George Washington	W 72–70	3–1	Hugh S. Greer Field House; Storrs, Connecticut
12/14/1976*		vs. Duke	L 59–64 ^{OT}	3–2	Madison Square Garden; New York City
12/16/1976*		at New Hampshire	W 65–51	4–2	Lundholm Gym; Durham, New Hampshire
12/28/1976*		Colgate; UConn Classic	W 73–66	5–2	Hartford Civic Center; Hartford, Connecticut
12/29/1976*		Illinois State; UConn Classic	L 77–88	5–3	Hartford Civic Center; Hartford, Connecticut
1/4/1977*		Maine	W 79–63	6–3	Hugh S. Greer Field House; Storrs, Connecticut
1/6/1977*		St. Peter's	W 52–50	7–3	Hugh S. Greer Field House; Storrs, Connecticut
1/8/1977*		Rutgers	L 77–84 ^{OT}	7–4	Hartford Civic Center; Hartford, Connecticut
1/11/1977*		at Providence	L 71–86	7–5	Providence Civic Center; Providence, Rhode Island
1/13/1977*		Massachusetts	L 80–81	7–6	Hartford Civic Center; Hartford, Connecticut
1/15/1977*		Harvard	W 68–64	8–6	Hugh S. Greer Field House; Storrs, Connecticut
1/18/1977*		New Hampshire	W 76–56	9–6	Hugh S. Greer Field House; Storrs, Connecticut
1/21/1977*		Rhode Island	W 67–65	10–6	Hartford Civic Center; Hartford, Connecticut
1/24/1977*		at Boston University	W 67–65	11–6	Case Gym; Boston
1/27/1977*		at Boston College	W 83–66	12–6	Roberts Center; Boston, Massachusetts
1/29/1977*		at Massachusetts	L 64–65	12–7	Curry Hicks Cage; Amherst, Massachusetts
2/10/1977*		at Manhattan	L 69–72 ^{OT}	12–8	Draddy Gymnasium; New York
2/12/1977*		Vermont	W 70–64	13–8	Hugh S. Greer Field House; Storrs, Connecticut
2/16/1977*		Holy Cross	W 89–85	14–8	Hugh S. Greer Field House; Storrs, Connecticut
2/19/1977*		at Vermont	L 77–85	14–9	Patrick Gym; Burlington, Vermont
2/26/1977*		at Rhode Island	W 90–89	15–9	Keaney Gymnasium; Kingston, Rhode Island
3/1/1977*		Fairfield	W 87–75	16–9	Hugh S. Greer Field House; Storrs, Connecticut
ECAC tournament
3/3/1977*		Holy Cross; Semifinals	L 77–89	16–10	Hartford Civic Center; Hartford, Connecticut
3/5/1977*		Fairfield; Third-place game	W 72–66	17–10	Hartford Civic Center; Hartford, Connecticut
*Non-conference game. ^{#}Rankings from AP Poll. (#) Tournament seedings in parentheses. All times are in Eastern Time.

Schedule Source:
