= 1976–77 Wake Forest Demon Deacons men's basketball team =

American college basketball season

1976–77 Wake Forest Demon Deacons men's basketball

NCAA Tournament, Elite Eight
- Conference: Atlantic Coast Conference

Ranking
- AP: No. 9
- Record: 22–8 (8–4 ACC)
- Head coach: Carl Tacy (5th season)
- Home arena: Winston-Salem Memorial Coliseum

1976–77 ACC men's basketball standings
	Conf.				Overall
Team	W		L	PCT	W		L	PCT
No. 5 North Carolina†	9	–	3	.750	28	–	5	.848
No. 9 Wake Forest	8	–	4	.667	22	–	8	.733
Clemson	8	–	4	.667	22	–	6	.786
Maryland	7	–	5	.583	19	–	8	.704
NC State	6	–	6	.500	17	–	11	.607
Virginia	2	–	10	.167	12	–	17	.414
Duke	2	–	10	.167	14	–	13	.519
† 1977 ACC tournament winner Rankings from AP Poll

The 1976–77 Wake Forest Demon Deacons men's basketball team represented Wake Forest University as a member of the Atlantic Coast Conference during the 1976–77 NCAA men's basketball season. Led by fifth-year head coach Carl Tacy, the team played home games at Winston-Salem Memorial Coliseum in Winston-Salem, North Carolina. After finishing second in the ACC regular season standings, the Demon Deacons made a quick exit from the ACC tournament. Wake Forest regrouped after receiving a bid to the NCAA Tournament, reaching the Midwest Regional Final before losing to eventual National champion Marquette.

== Roster ==
1976–77 Wake Forest Demon Deacons men's basketball team
Players
Coaches

Pos.	#	Name	Height	Weight	Year	Hometown
G		Skip Brown	6 ft 0 in (1.83 m)	165 lb (75 kg)	Sr	Kingsport, Tennessee
G	14	Frank Johnson	6 ft 1 in (1.85 m)	185 lb (84 kg)	Fr	Summerfield, Florida
F	32	Rod Griffin	6 ft 7 in (2.01 m)	215 lb (98 kg)	Jr	Fairmont, North Carolina

Head coach

- Carl Tacy

Assistant coach(es)

Legend

- (C) Team captain
- (S) Suspended
- (I) Ineligible
- (W) Walk-on
- Injured
- Current redshirt

== Schedule and results ==
Date time, TV	Rank^{#}	Opponent^{#}	Result	Record	Site city, state
Regular season
Nov 26, 1976*		vs. Duke; Big Four Tournament	W 81–80	1–0	Greensboro Coliseum (15,624); Greensboro, North Carolina
Nov 27, 1976*		vs. No. 3 North Carolina; Big Four Tournament	W 97–96 ^{OT}	2–0	Greensboro Coliseum (15,624); Greensboro, North Carolina
Dec 1, 1976*	No. 14	East Tennessee State	W 94–63	3–0	Winston-Salem Memorial Coliseum (7,100); Winston-Salem, North Carolina
Dec 3, 1976*	No. 14	Washington	W 92–75	4–0	Winston-Salem Memorial Coliseum (8,050); Winston-Salem, North Carolina
Dec 8, 1976*	No. 11	at William & Mary	W 90–84 ^{OT}	5–0	William & Mary Hall (5,100); Williamsburg, Virginia
Dec, 1976*		UNC Asheville	W 84–73	6–0	Winston-Salem Memorial Coliseum (6,750); Winston-Salem, North Carolina
Dec 21, 1976*		Fairleigh Dickinson	W 99–63	7–0	Winston-Salem Memorial Coliseum (5,850); Winston-Salem, North Carolina
Dec 28, 1976*	No. 7	vs. Mississippi State; Old Dominion Classic	L 83–88	7–1	Norfolk Scope (8,759); Norfolk, Virginia
Dec 29, 1976*	No. 7	vs. Dartmouth; Old Dominion Classic	W 84–61	8–1	Norfolk Scope (9,011); Norfolk, Virginia
Jan 1, 1977*	No. 7	at Richmond	W 84–73	9–1	Robins Center (6,000); Richmond, Virginia
Jan 5, 1977	No. 10	Virginia	W 67–63	10–1 (1–0)	Winston-Salem Memorial Coliseum (8,250); Winston-Salem, North Carolina
Jan 8, 1977	No. 10	at No. 15 Maryland	W 86–85 ^{OT}	11–1 (2–0)	Cole Fieldhouse (14,372); College Park, Maryland
Jan 13, 1977	No. 7	No. 5 North Carolina	L 75–77	11–2 (2–1)	Winston-Salem Memorial Coliseum (8,200); Winston-Salem, North Carolina
Jan 15, 1977	No. 7	at No. 17 Clemson	W 84–82	12–2 (3–1)	Littlejohn Coliseum (10,371); Clemson, South Carolina
Jan 19, 1977	No. 9	Duke	W 85–73	13–2 (4–1)	Winston-Salem Memorial Coliseum (8,200); Winston-Salem, North Carolina
Jan 22, 1977*	No. 9	UNC Charlotte	W 74–72	14–2	Winston-Salem Memorial Coliseum (15,000); Winston-Salem, North Carolina
Jan 26, 1977	No. 4	at No. 10 North Carolina	W 67–66	15–2 (5–1)	Carmichael Auditorium (10,000); Chapel Hill, North Carolina
Jan 29, 1977*	No. 10	Appalachian State	W 83–73	16–2	Winston-Salem Memorial Coliseum (8,260); Winston-Salem, North Carolina
Feb 2, 1977	No. 5	at Duke	W 89–80	17–2 (6–1)	Cameron Indoor Stadium (8,333); Durham, North Carolina
Feb 5, 1977	No. 5	at Virginia	W 80–72	18–2 (7–1)	University Hall (8,500); Charlottesville, Virginia
Feb 8, 1977	No. 4	No. 15 Clemson	L 66–70	18–3 (7–2)	Winston-Salem Memorial Coliseum (8,300); Winston-Salem, North Carolina
Feb 12, 1977	No. 4	NC State	W 84–77	19–3 (8–2)	Winston-Salem Memorial Coliseum (8,350); Winston-Salem, North Carolina
Feb 16, 1977*	No. 7	at Davidson	W 70–68	20–3	Johnston Gym (3,001); Davidson, North Carolina
Feb 19, 1977*	No. 7	Virginia Tech	L 97–98 ^{OT}	20–4	Winston-Salem Memorial Coliseum (8,300); Winston-Salem, North Carolina
Feb 22, 1977	No. 11	Maryland	L 80–81	20–5 (8–3)	Winston-Salem Memorial Coliseum (15,409); Winston-Salem, North Carolina
Feb 26, 1977	No. 11	at NC State	L 85–91	20–6 (8–4)	Reynolds Coliseum (12,400); Raleigh, North Carolina
ACC tournament
Mar 3, 1977*	(2) No. 16	(7) Virginia; Quarterfinals	L 57–59	20–7	Greensboro Coliseum (15,375); Greensboro, North Carolina
NCAA tournament
Mar 12, 1977*	No. 9	vs. No. 8 Arkansas; First round	W 86–80	21–7	Lloyd Noble Center (10,871); Norman, Oklahoma
Mar 17, 1977*	No. 9	vs. Southern Illinois; Midwest Regional Semifinal – Sweet Sixteen	W 86–81	22–7	Myriad Convention Center (10,185); Oklahoma City, Oklahoma
Mar 19, 1977*	No. 9	vs. No. 7 Marquette; Midwest Regional Final – Elite Eight	L 68–82	22–8	Myriad Convention Center (8,935); Oklahoma City, Oklahoma
*Non-conference game. ^{#}Rankings from AP Poll. (#) Tournament seedings in parentheses. MW=Midwest. All times are in Eastern Time.
