= 1976–77 Providence Friars men's basketball team =

American college basketball season

1976–77 Providence Friars men's basketball

NCAA Tournament, first round
- Conference: Independent

Ranking
- Coaches: No. 15
- Record: 24–5
- Head coach: Dave Gavitt (8th season)
- Home arena: Providence Civic Center

1976–77 NCAA Division I men's basketball independents standings
| | Conf. | | | | Overall |
| Team | W | | L | PCT | W | | L | PCT |
|---|---|---|---|---|---|---|---|---|
| No. 4 UNLV | | – | | – | 29 | – | 3 | .906 |
| Indiana State | | – | | – | 25 | – | 3 | .893 |
| No. 6 Syracuse | | – | | – | 26 | – | 4 | .867 |
| No. 12 Detroit | | – | | – | 25 | – | 4 | .862 |
| Old Dominion | | – | | – | 25 | – | 4 | .862 |
| Providence | | – | | – | 24 | – | 5 | .828 |
| Holy Cross | | – | | – | 23 | – | 6 | .793 |
| St. Bonaventure | | – | | – | 23 | – | 6 | .793 |
| No. 7 Marquette | | – | | – | 25 | – | 7 | .781 |
| North Texas State | | – | | – | 21 | – | 6 | .778 |
| Illinois State | | – | | – | 22 | – | 7 | .759 |
| No. 10 Notre Dame | | – | | – | 22 | – | 7 | .759 |
| Creighton | | – | | – | 21 | – | 7 | .750 |
| Oral Roberts | | – | | – | 21 | – | 7 | .750 |
| Army | | – | | – | 20 | – | 8 | .714 |
| St. John's | | – | | – | 22 | – | 9 | .710 |
| Milwaukee | | – | | – | 19 | – | 8 | .704 |
| Georgetown | | – | | – | 19 | – | 9 | .679 |
| Virginia Tech | | – | | – | 19 | – | 10 | .655 |
| James Madison | | – | | – | 17 | – | 9 | .654 |
| Northwestern State | | – | | – | 17 | – | 9 | .654 |
| Texas–Pan American | | – | | – | 17 | – | 9 | .654 |
| Connecticut | | – | | – | 17 | – | 10 | .630 |
| Seton Hall | | – | | – | 18 | – | 11 | .621 |
| UNC Wilmington | | – | | – | 16 | – | 10 | .615 |
| Portland State | | – | | – | 16 | – | 10 | .615 |
| Iona | | – | | – | 15 | – | 10 | .600 |
| Dayton | | – | | – | 16 | – | 11 | .593 |
| Fairfield | | – | | – | 16 | – | 11 | .593 |
| Georgia Southern | | – | | – | 16 | – | 11 | .593 |
| Richmond | | – | | – | 15 | – | 11 | .577 |
| Saint Francis (PA) | | – | | – | 15 | – | 11 | .577 |
| DePaul | | – | | – | 15 | – | 12 | .556 |
| Northeast Louisiana | | – | | – | 15 | – | 12 | .556 |
| Stetson | | – | | – | 15 | – | 12 | .556 |
| Utah State | | – | | – | 15 | – | 12 | .556 |
| Colgate | | – | | – | 13 | – | 11 | .542 |
| Navy | | – | | – | 13 | – | 11 | .542 |
| Oklahoma City | | – | | – | 14 | – | 12 | .538 |
| South Carolina | | – | | – | 14 | – | 12 | .538 |
| Valparaiso | | – | | – | 13 | – | 12 | .520 |
| Catholic | | – | | – | 13 | – | 13 | .500 |
| Fairleigh Dickinson | | – | | – | 13 | – | 13 | .500 |
| Loyola (IL) | | – | | – | 13 | – | 13 | .500 |
| Maine | | – | | – | 13 | – | 13 | .500 |
| Niagara | | – | | – | 13 | – | 13 | .500 |
| Rhode Island | | – | | – | 13 | – | 13 | .500 |
| Saint Peter's | | – | | – | 13 | – | 13 | .500 |
| VCU | | – | | – | 13 | – | 13 | .500 |
| Butler | | – | | – | 13 | – | 14 | .481 |
| Manhattan | | – | | – | 13 | – | 14 | .481 |
| New Hampshire | | – | | – | 12 | – | 14 | .462 |
| Northeastern | | – | | – | 12 | – | 14 | .462 |
| St. Francis (NY) | | – | | – | 12 | – | 14 | .462 |
| Air Force | | – | | – | 12 | – | 15 | .444 |
| Denver | | – | | – | 12 | – | 15 | .444 |
| Southern Mississippi | | – | | – | 11 | – | 16 | .407 |
| Siena | | – | | – | 9 | – | 15 | .375 |
| Cleveland State | | – | | – | 10 | – | 17 | .370 |
| Xavier | | – | | – | 10 | – | 17 | .370 |
| Centenary (LA) | | – | | – | 11 | – | 19 | .367 |
| Long Island | | – | | – | 9 | – | 16 | .360 |
| Hawaii | | – | | – | 9 | – | 18 | .333 |
| Western Carolina | | – | | – | 8 | – | 16 | .333 |
| Vermont | | – | | – | 8 | – | 17 | .320 |
| Boston College | | – | | – | 8 | – | 18 | .308 |
| Baptist | | – | | – | 8 | – | 19 | .296 |
| Marshall | | – | | – | 8 | – | 19 | .296 |
| Boston University | | – | | – | 7 | – | 19 | .269 |
| Robert Morris | | – | | – | 7 | – | 19 | .269 |
| Samford | | – | | – | 7 | – | 19 | .269 |
| Mercer | | – | | – | 6 | – | 19 | .240 |
| Hardin–Simmons | | – | | – | 6 | – | 21 | .222 |
| Houston Baptist | | – | | – | 6 | – | 23 | .207 |
| Buffalo | | – | | – | 5 | – | 21 | .192 |
| Fordham | | – | | – | 5 | – | 21 | .192 |
| Wagner | | – | | – | 3 | – | 21 | .125 |
| Canisius | | – | | – | 3 | – | 22 | .120 |
Rankings from AP Poll

The 1976–77 Providence Friars men's basketball team represented Providence College during the 1976–77 NCAA Division I men's basketball season.

Senior Guard Joe Hassett was the team's captain and leading scorer, averaging 18.8 points per game. Junior Forward Bruce Campbell with 8.1 rebounds.

The Friars would receive an at-large bid into the NCAA Tournament where they would fall in the first round to Kansas State.

== Roster ==
1976–77 Providence Friars men's basketball team
Players
Coaches

| Pos. | # | Name | Height | Weight | Year | Hometown |
|---|---|---|---|---|---|---|
| G | 20 | Paul Aiello | 6 ft 5 in (1.96 m) | 175 lb (79 kg) | Fr | Johnston, Rhode Island |
| F | 23 | Bruce Campbell | 6 ft 9 in (2.06 m) | 210 lb (95 kg) | Jr | New Haven, Connecticut |
| C | 32 | Bob Cooper | 6 ft 7 in (2.01 m) | 205 lb (93 kg) | Sr | Chicago, Illinois |
| F | 12 | Bill Eason | 6 ft 5 in (1.96 m) | 180 lb (82 kg) | Jr | Waterbury, Connecticut |
| G | 11 | Dave Frye | 6 ft 0 in (1.83 m) | 155 lb (70 kg) | So | Greensburg, Pennsylvania |
| G | 10 | Joe Hassett | 6 ft 5 in (1.96 m) | 180 lb (82 kg) | Sr | Providence, Rhode Island |
| C | 24 | Pat Kehoe | 6 ft 7 in (2.01 m) | 240 lb (109 kg) | Jr | Landover, Maryland |
| C | 31 | Bob Misevicius | 6 ft 9 in (2.06 m) | 230 lb (104 kg) | Jr | Ozone Park, New York |
| G | 15 | Joe Mullaney | 5 ft 11 in (1.8 m) | 175 lb (79 kg) | Jr | Baltimore, Maryland |
| G | 25 | Paul Oristaglio | 6 ft 0 in (1.83 m) | 160 lb (73 kg) | Jr | Broomall, Pennsylvania |
| G | 22 | Dwight Williams | 6 ft 0 in (1.83 m) | 175 lb (79 kg) | So | Buffalo, New York |
| G | 5 | Ken Woodson | 6 ft 1 in (1.85 m) | 155 lb (70 kg) | Fr | New Haven, Connecticut |

Head coach

- Dave Gavitt

Assistant coach(es)

Legend

- (C) Team captain
- (S) Suspended
- (I) Ineligible
- (W) Walk-on
- Injured
- Current redshirt

== Schedule ==
| Date time, TV | Rank^{#} | Opponent^{#} | Result | Record | Site city, state |
|---|---|---|---|---|---|
| November 27 | | Stone Hill | W 78–58 | 1–0 | Providence Civic Center; Providence, RI |
| November 29 | | at Brown | W 95–69 | 2–0 | Marvel Gym |
| December 1 | | Assumption | W 92–71 | 3–0 | Providence Civic Center; Providence, RI |
| December 4 | | Purdue | L 62–68 ^{OT} | 3–1 | Providence Civic Center; Providence, RI |
| December 11 | | at Boston College | W 77–67 | 4–1 | Roberts Center; Chestnut Hill, Massachusetts |
| December 12 | | at Holy Cross | L 65–67 | 4–2 | Hart Recreation Center; Worcester, Massachusetts |
| December 18 | | Brown | W 102–82 | 5–2 | Providence Civic Center; Providence, RI |
| December 28 | | Texas | W 81–67 | 6–2 | Providence Civic Center; Providence, RI |
| December 29 | | Michigan | W 82–81 ^{2OT} | 7–2 | Providence Civic Center; Providence, RI |
| January 2 | | Seton Hall | W 72–68 ^{OT} | 8–2 | Providence Civic Center; Providence, RI |
| January 5 | | Saint Joseph's | W 65–64 | 9–2 | Providence Civic Center; Providence, RI |
| January 8 | | Massachusetts | W 68–62 | 10–2 | Providence Civic Center; Providence, RI |
| January 11 | | Connecticut | W 86–71 | 11–2 | Providence Civic Center; Providence, RI |
| January 15 | | Hawaii | W 94–76 | 12–2 | Providence Civic Center; Providence, RI |
| January 18 | | Rhode Island | W 82–71 | 13–2 | Providence Civic Center; Providence, RI |
| January 22 | | Boston University | W 83–68 | 14–2 | Providence Civic Center; Providence, RI |
| January 24 | | at Canisius | W 83–68 | 15–2 | Buffalo Memorial Auditorium; Buffalo, NY |
| January 25 | | at Niagara | W 71–63 ^{2OT} | 16–2 | Gallagher Center; Lewiston, NY |
| February 1 | | St. Bonaventure | W 82–75 | 17–2 | Providence Civic Center; Providence, RI |
| February 3 | | at Rhode Island | W 67–66 | 18–2 | Keaney Gymnasium; Kingston, RI |
| February 6 | No. 15 | at No. 9 Louisville | L 64–68 | 18–3 | Freedom Hall; Louisville, Kentucky |
| February 9 | | DePaul | W 84–73 | 19–3 | Providence Civic Center; Providence, RI |
| February 12 | | Long Island | W 99–85 | 20–3 | Providence Civic Center; Providence, RI |
| February 19 | | at LaSalle | W 75–62 | 21–3 | Palestra; Philadelphia, Pennsylvania |
| February 22 | | at Villanova | W 84–71 | 22–3 | Villanova Field House |
| February 26 | | at St. John's | W 69–66 | 23–3 | Madison Square Garden; New York, New York |
| March 3 | | at Fairfield | W 44–31 | 24–3 | Hartford Civic Center; Hartford, Connecticut |
| March 5 | | vs. Holy Cross | L 67–68 | 24–4 | Hartford Civic Center; Hartford, Connecticut |
| March 12 | | vs. Kansas State; NCAA Tournament • First Round | L 80–87 | 24–5 | Lloyd Noble Center; Norman, Oklahoma |
*Non-conference game. ^{#}Rankings from AP Poll. (#) Tournament seedings in parentheses.

== Team players drafted into the NBA ==
| Round | Pick | Player | NBA club |
|---|---|---|---|
| 3 | 52 | Joe Hassett | Seattle SuperSonics |
