= 1976–77 Illinois State Redbirds men's basketball team =

American college basketball season

1976–77 Illinois State Redbirds men's basketball

Connecticut Classic champion

NIT, Quarterfinal
- Conference: Independent
- Record: 22–7
- Head coach: Gene Smithson (2nd season)
- Assistant coaches: Ron Ferguson; Bill Flanagan; Jeff Jones; Roger Powell
- Home arena: Horton Field House

1976–77 NCAA Division I men's basketball independents standings
	Conf.				Overall
Team	W		L	PCT	W		L	PCT
No. 4 UNLV		–		–	29	–	3	.906
Indiana State		–		–	25	–	3	.893
No. 6 Syracuse		–		–	26	–	4	.867
No. 12 Detroit		–		–	25	–	4	.862
Old Dominion		–		–	25	–	4	.862
Providence		–		–	24	–	5	.828
Holy Cross		–		–	23	–	6	.793
St. Bonaventure		–		–	23	–	6	.793
No. 7 Marquette		–		–	25	–	7	.781
North Texas State		–		–	21	–	6	.778
Illinois State		–		–	22	–	7	.759
No. 10 Notre Dame		–		–	22	–	7	.759
Creighton		–		–	21	–	7	.750
Oral Roberts		–		–	21	–	7	.750
Army		–		–	20	–	8	.714
St. John's		–		–	22	–	9	.710
Milwaukee		–		–	19	–	8	.704
Georgetown		–		–	19	–	9	.679
Virginia Tech		–		–	19	–	10	.655
James Madison		–		–	17	–	9	.654
Northwestern State		–		–	17	–	9	.654
Texas–Pan American		–		–	17	–	9	.654
Connecticut		–		–	17	–	10	.630
Seton Hall		–		–	18	–	11	.621
UNC Wilmington		–		–	16	–	10	.615
Portland State		–		–	16	–	10	.615
Iona		–		–	15	–	10	.600
Dayton		–		–	16	–	11	.593
Fairfield		–		–	16	–	11	.593
Georgia Southern		–		–	16	–	11	.593
Richmond		–		–	15	–	11	.577
Saint Francis (PA)		–		–	15	–	11	.577
DePaul		–		–	15	–	12	.556
Northeast Louisiana		–		–	15	–	12	.556
Stetson		–		–	15	–	12	.556
Utah State		–		–	15	–	12	.556
Colgate		–		–	13	–	11	.542
Navy		–		–	13	–	11	.542
Oklahoma City		–		–	14	–	12	.538
South Carolina		–		–	14	–	12	.538
Valparaiso		–		–	13	–	12	.520
Catholic		–		–	13	–	13	.500
Fairleigh Dickinson		–		–	13	–	13	.500
Loyola (IL)		–		–	13	–	13	.500
Maine		–		–	13	–	13	.500
Niagara		–		–	13	–	13	.500
Rhode Island		–		–	13	–	13	.500
Saint Peter's		–		–	13	–	13	.500
VCU		–		–	13	–	13	.500
Butler		–		–	13	–	14	.481
Manhattan		–		–	13	–	14	.481
New Hampshire		–		–	12	–	14	.462
Northeastern		–		–	12	–	14	.462
St. Francis (NY)		–		–	12	–	14	.462
Air Force		–		–	12	–	15	.444
Denver		–		–	12	–	15	.444
Southern Mississippi		–		–	11	–	16	.407
Siena		–		–	9	–	15	.375
Cleveland State		–		–	10	–	17	.370
Xavier		–		–	10	–	17	.370
Centenary (LA)		–		–	11	–	19	.367
Long Island		–		–	9	–	16	.360
Hawaii		–		–	9	–	18	.333
Western Carolina		–		–	8	–	16	.333
Vermont		–		–	8	–	17	.320
Boston College		–		–	8	–	18	.308
Baptist		–		–	8	–	19	.296
Marshall		–		–	8	–	19	.296
Boston University		–		–	7	–	19	.269
Robert Morris		–		–	7	–	19	.269
Samford		–		–	7	–	19	.269
Mercer		–		–	6	–	19	.240
Hardin–Simmons		–		–	6	–	21	.222
Houston Baptist		–		–	6	–	23	.207
Buffalo		–		–	5	–	21	.192
Fordham		–		–	5	–	21	.192
Wagner		–		–	3	–	21	.125
Canisius		–		–	3	–	22	.120
Rankings from AP Poll

The 1976–77 Illinois State Redbirds men's basketball team represented Illinois State University during the 1976–77 NCAA Division I men's basketball season. The Redbirds, led by second year head coach Gene Smithson, played their home games at Horton Field House and competed as an independent (not a member of a conference). They finished the season 22–7.

The Redbirds received an invitation to the 1977 National Invitation Tournament. It was their first postseason appearance as an NCAA Division I member. They defeated Creighton University in the regional round and lost to the University of Houston in the quarterfinal round.

== Roster ==
1976–77 Illinois State Redbirds men's basketball team
Players
Coaches

Pos.	#	Name	Height	Weight	Year	Hometown
F	24	John Crossen	6 ft 6 in (1.98 m)	220 lb (100 kg)	Sr	St. Clair Shores, MI
F	52	Jeff Widdel	6 ft 6 in (1.98 m)	209 lb (95 kg)	Sr	Rock Island, IL
C	00	Jeff Wilkins	7 ft 0 in (2.13 m)	225 lb (102 kg)	Sr	Chicago, IL
F	10	Billy Lewis	6 ft 6 in (1.98 m)	195 lb (88 kg)	Jr	Chicago, IL
G	31	Rick Ferina	6 ft 3 in (1.91 m)	180 lb (82 kg)	So	Niles, IL
G	21	Derrick Mayes	6 ft 1 in (1.85 m)	170 lb (77 kg)	So	Elgin, IL
C	32	Joe Galvin	7 ft 0 in (2.13 m)	200 lb (91 kg)	Fr	Bloomington, IL
G	13	Ron Jones	6 ft 4 in (1.93 m)	165 lb (75 kg)	Fr	Venice, IL
F	35	Larry Lowe	6 ft 8 in (2.03 m)	190 lb (86 kg)	Fr	Glenwood, IL
F	42	Robert McCoy	6 ft 5 in (1.96 m)	195 lb (88 kg)	Fr	Chicago Heights, IL
G	44	Randy Smithson (injured)	6 ft 3 in (1.91 m)	170 lb (77 kg)	Fr	Normal, IL
F	45	Del Yarbrough	6 ft 7 in (2.01 m)	225 lb (102 kg)	Fr	North Chicago, IL

Head coach

- Gene Smithson (North Central (IL))

Assistant coach(es)

- Ron Ferguson (Illinois)
- Bill Flanagan (Monmouth (IL))
- Jeff Jones (Illinois State)
- Roger Powell (Illinois State)

Legend

- (C) Team captain
- (S) Suspended
- (I) Ineligible
- (W) Walk-on
- Injured
- Current redshirt

== Schedule ==
Date time, TV	Rank^{#}	Opponent^{#}	Result	Record	High points	High rebounds	High assists	Site (attendance) city, state
Regular Season
November 26, 1976*; 7:00 pm		vs. Northeast Louisiana; New Orleans Classic [Semifinal]	W 87–78	1–0	26 – Lewis	12 – Lewis	–	Health & Physical Education Center (2,850); New Orleans, LA
November 27, 1976*		at New Orleans; New Orleans Classic [Final]	L 73–91	1–1	17 – Wilkins, Mayes	12 – Wilkins	–	Health & Physical Education Center (3,162); New Orleans, LA
November 30, 1976*; 7:30 pm		Lewis	W 79–60	2–1	16 – Lewis	15 – Lewis	–	Horton Field House (5,000); Normal, IL
December 4, 1976*; 6:00 pm		at Central Michigan	W 81–76	3–1	28 – Wilkins	11 – Lewis	–	Daniel P. Rose Center (6,075); Mount Pleasant, MI
December 6, 1976*; 7:30 pm		Northern Illinois	W 78–76	4–1	29 – Wilkins	10 – Wilkins	–	Horton Field House (4,700); Normal, IL
December 11, 1976*; 7:30 pm		San Jose State	W 101–82	5–1	18 – Wilkins	13 – Wilkins	–	Horton Field House (5,500); Normal, IL
December 18, 1976*; 7:15 pm		at Akron	W 91–85	6–1	27 – Wilkins	14 – Wilkins	–	Memorial Hall (832); Akron, OH
December 20, 1976*; 6:30 pm		at Kent State	W 73–69	7–1	26 – Wilkins	12 – Wilkins	–	Memorial Gymnasium (1,200); Kent, OH
December 23, 1976*; 7:30 pm		Drake	L 67–80	7–2	23 – Wilkins	14 – Wilkins	–	Horton Field House (5,200); Normal, IL
December 28, 1976*		vs. Seattle; Connecticut Classic [Semifinal]	W 83–72	8–2	28 – Lewis	14 – Wilkins	–	Hartford Civic Center (6,630); Hartford, CT
December 29, 1976*		at Connecticut; Connecticut Classic [Final]	W 88–77	9–2	–	–	–	Hartford Civic Center (9,367); Hartford, CT
January 3, 1977*; 7:30 pm, WEEK		Bradley	W 89–66	10–2	–	–	–	Horton Field House (6,200); Normal, IL
January 5, 1977*; 7:30 pm		Pacific	W 74–56	11–2	–	–	–	Horton Field House (3,200); Normal, IL
January 10, 1977*; 7:30 pm		Northern Iowa	W 74–61	12–2	–	–	–	Horton Field House (5,700); Normal, IL
January 12, 1977*; 10:05 pm		at San Jose State	L 75–79	12–3	–	–	–	Independence High School Gymnasium (2,350); San Jose CA
January 15, 1977*; 7:30 pm		at Oral Roberts	L 75–84	12–4	–	–	–	John Mabee Center (9,646); Tulsa, OK
January 19, 1977*; 7:30 pm		Saint Louis	L 77–84 ^{2OT}	12–5	–	–	–	Horton Field House (4,200); Normal, IL
January 22, 1977*; 7:30 pm		at Western Illinois	W 89–80	13–5	–	–	–	Western Hall (4,220); Macomb, IL
January 25, 1977*; 7:30 pm		Indiana State	W 70–64	14–5	–	–	–	Horton Field House (5,300); Normal, IL
January 27, 1977*; 7:30 pm		Northern Colorado	W 108–61	15–5	–	–	–	Horton Field House (3,500); Normal, IL
January 31, 1977*; 6:30 pm		at Indiana State	L 84–100	15–6	–	–	–	Hulman Civic University Center (10,102); Terre Haute, IN
February 3, 1977*; 7:30 pm		No. 4 Nevada–Las Vegas	W 88–84	16–6	–	–	–	Horton Field House (8,000); Normal, IL
February 5, 1977*; 6:30 pm		at Marshall	W 103–91	17–6	–	–	–	Veterans Memorial Fieldhouse (2,638); Huntington, WV
February 12, 1977*; 7:30 pm		Southern Illinois–Edwardsville	W 85–58	18–6	–	–	–	Horton Field House (5,300); Normal, IL
February 16, 1977*; 7:30 pm		at Northern Illinois	W 70–66	19–6	–	–	–	Chick Evans Field House (6,076); DeKalb, IL
February 19, 1977*; 7:30 pm		South Alabama	W 107–82	20–6	–	–	–	Horton Field House (5,700); Normal, IL
February 26, 1977*; 7:30 pm		Butler	W 83–75	21–6	41 – Wilkins	–	–	Horton Field House (8,000); Normal, IL
National Invitation {NIT} Tournament
March 8, 1977*; 7:30 pm		at Creighton; Regional	W 65–58	22–6	21 – Wilkins	12 – Wilkins	4 – Lewis	Omaha Civic Auditorium (6,336); Omaha, NE
March 14, 1977*; 8:00 pm		vs. Houston; Quarterfinal	L 90–91 ^{OT}	22–7	28 – Wilkins	9 – Wilkins	13 – Jones	Madison Square Garden (IV) (9,581); New York, NY
*Non-conference game. ^{#}Rankings from AP Poll. (#) Tournament seedings in parentheses. All times are in Central Standard Time.
