= 1977 ACC men's basketball tournament =

- Classification: Division I
- Season: 1976–77
- Teams: 7
- Site: Greensboro Coliseum; Greensboro, North Carolina
- Champions: North Carolina (7th title)
- Winning coach: Dean Smith (6th title)
- MVP: John Kuester (North Carolina)
- Television: The C.D. Chesley Company

1976–77 ACC men's basketball standings
	Conf.				Overall
Team	W		L	PCT	W		L	PCT
No. 5 North Carolina†	9	–	3	.750	28	–	5	.848
No. 9 Wake Forest	8	–	4	.667	22	–	8	.733
Clemson	8	–	4	.667	22	–	6	.786
Maryland	7	–	5	.583	19	–	8	.704
NC State	6	–	6	.500	17	–	11	.607
Virginia	2	–	10	.167	12	–	17	.414
Duke	2	–	10	.167	14	–	13	.519
† 1977 ACC tournament winner Rankings from AP Poll

The 1977 Atlantic Coast Conference men's basketball tournament was held in Greensboro, North Carolina, at the Greensboro Coliseum from March 3–5. North Carolina defeated Virginia, 75–69, to win the championship. John Kuester of North Carolina was named the tournament MVP.

== Bracket ==
Quarterfinals; March 3
4	Maryland	71
5	NC State	82
2	#16 Wake Forest	57
7	Virginia	59
3	#18 Clemson	82
6	Duke	74

Semifinals; March 4
1	#6 North Carolina	70
5	NC State	56
7	Virginia	72
3	#18 Clemson	60

Championship Game; March 5
1	#6 North Carolina	75
7	Virginia	69
