= John Kuester =

American basketball coach (born 1955)

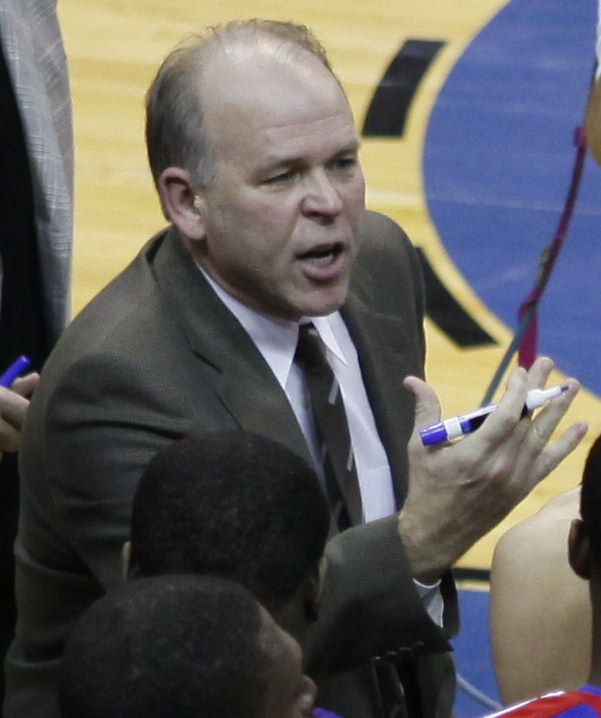
- Kuester coaching the Detroit Pistons in 2009

Personal information
- Born: February 6, 1955 (age 71) Richmond, Virginia, U.S.
- Listed height: 6 ft 2 in (1.88 m)
- Listed weight: 180 lb (82 kg)

Career information
- High school: Benedictine (Richmond, Virginia)
- College: North Carolina (1973–1977)
- NBA draft: 1977: 3rd round, 53rd overall pick
- Drafted by: Kansas City Kings
- Playing career: 1977–1980
- Position: Point guard
- Number: 5, 10
- Coaching career: 1980–2012

Career history

Playing
- 1977–1978: Kansas City Kings
- 1978–1979: Denver Nuggets
- 1979–1980: Indiana Pacers

Coaching
- 1980–1981: Richmond (assistant)
- 1981–1983: Boston University (assistant)
- 1983–1985: Boston University
- 1985–1990: George Washington
- 1995–1997: Boston Celtics (assistant)
- 1997–2003: Philadelphia 76ers (assistant)
- 2003–2004: Detroit Pistons (assistant)
- 2004–2005: New Jersey Nets (assistant)
- 2005–2006: Philadelphia 76ers (assistant)
- 2006–2007: Orlando Magic (assistant)
- 2007–2009: Cleveland Cavaliers (assistant)
- 2009–2011: Detroit Pistons
- 2011–2012: Los Angeles Lakers (assistant)

Career highlights
- As player: ACC tournament MVP (1977); Third-team Parade All-American (1973); As assistant coach: NBA champion (2004)
- Stats at NBA.com
- Stats at Basketball Reference

John Dewitt Kuester Jr. (/ˈkjuːstər/; born February 6, 1955) is an American basketball coach and scout. As a player he spent three seasons in the National Basketball Association (NBA) from 1977 to 1980 and then coached in the college ranks before moving on to the NBA sidelines as an assistant. Kuester was named head coach of the Detroit Pistons in July 2009 and coached the team for two seasons.

A 6-foot-2-inch (1.88 m) and 180 pounds (82 kg) guard, Kuester played collegiately with the University of North Carolina Tar Heels from 1973 to 1977.

== Playing career ==
=== High school ===
Kuester played four years at Benedictine for legendary coach Warren Rutledge. Leading his team to three consecutive state Catholic League titles, the Cadets were 31–3 his senior year.

=== College ===
Kuester played four seasons with the UNC Tar Heels under head coach Dean Smith, for whom he won two ACC championships and helped reach the NCAA tournament four times, including an appearance in the 1977 NCAA Finals, in which they lost to Marquette 67–59. In both his junior and senior year (1976 and 1977), Kuester was voted UNC's best defensive player. Also in his senior year, he was voted Most Valuable Player of the ACC Tournament and the NCAA East Regionals.

=== Professional ===
Kuester was selected with the 9th pick of the third round (53rd overall) in the 1977 NBA draft by the Kansas City Kings. He played 78 games for them in 1977–78, averaging 4.8 points, 1.5 rebounds and 3.2 assists per game. In his second and third (and final) seasons he played with the Denver Nuggets and Indiana Pacers, respectively.

== Coaching career ==
After his playing days, Kuester began a basketball coaching career, volunteering as an assistant at the University of Richmond from 1980 to 1981. From 1981 to 1983, he was an assistant to Rick Pitino at Boston University before succeeding him in 1983 as the youngest head coach in NCAA Division I.

From 1985 to 1990, Kuester was the head coach at George Washington University. His 1988–1989 Colonials team compiled a 1–27 record, one of the worst ever in NCAA history.

He continued his career on the sidelines in the NBA, joining the Boston Celtics in 1990 and serving as an assistant from 1995 to 1997, and from 1997 to 2003 as an assistant for the Philadelphia 76ers under head coach Larry Brown. In 2003–04, Kuester followed Brown to the Detroit Pistons where he also served as an assistant. In 2004–05, Kuester was an assistant with the New Jersey Nets, and returned to the 76ers once more in 2005–06. In July 2006, he was named as an assistant coach for the Orlando Magic. In August 2007, Kuester was named to Cleveland Cavaliers head coach Mike Brown's staff, replacing the departing Kenny Natt.

In July 2009, Kuester was hired as head coach of the Detroit Pistons, replacing Michael Curry. An agreement was made after the Pistons and their first choice, Avery Johnson, broke off contract talks. On June 5, 2011, Kuester was fired from his position as head coach of the Detroit Pistons.

On June 29, 2011, he was hired as an assistant coach for the Los Angeles Lakers under new head coach Mike Brown. Since his days in Cleveland, this marked the second time Kuester has worked as an assistant coach under Brown.

On September 7, 2012, Kuester was named an advance scout for the Lakers.

== Family ==
Kuester and wife, Tricia, have a son, John III, and a daughter, Katelyn. ("Katie") played basketball at St. Joseph's University.

== Career playing statistics ==
Legend
GP	Games played	GS	Games started	MPG	Minutes per game
FG%	Field goal percentage	3P%	3-point field goal percentage	FT%	Free throw percentage
RPG	Rebounds per game	APG	Assists per game	SPG	Steals per game
BPG	Blocks per game	PPG	Points per game	**Bold**	Career high

=== NBA ===
==== Regular season ====
Year	Team	GP	GS	MPG	FG%	3P%	FT%	RPG	APG	SPG	BPG	PPG
1977–78	Kansas City	**78**		**15.6**	**.455**		.829	**1.5**	**3.2**	**.7**	.0	**4.8**
1978–79	Denver	33		6.4	.308		**.929**	.4	1.1	.5	.0	1.4
1979–80	Indiana	24	0	4.2	.353	.000	.714	.6	.7	.3	.0	1.2
Career		135	0	11.3	.427	.000	.833	1.0	2.3	.6	.0	3.3

== Head coaching record ==
=== College ===
Record table
Season	Team	Overall	Conference	Standing	Postseason
**Boston University Terriers** (Eastern College Athletic Conference-North) (1983–1995)
1983–84	Boston University	16–13	9–5	T–2nd	
1984–85	Boston University	15–15	9–7	5th	
Boston University:		31–28	18–12		
**George Washington Colonials** (Atlantic 10 Conference) (1985–1990)
1985–86	George Washington	12–16	7–11	6th	
1986–87	George Washington	10–19	6–12	8th	
1987–88	George Washington	13–15	7–11	T–6th	
1988–89	George Washington	1–27	1–17	10th	
1989–90	George Washington	14–17	6–12	7th	
George Washington:		50–94	27–63		
Total:		81–122			

=== NBA ===
Legend
Regular season	G	Games coached	W	Games won	L	Games lost	W–L %	Win–loss %
Playoffs	PG	Playoff games	PW	Playoff wins	PL	Playoff losses	PW–L %	Playoff win–loss %

Team	Year	G	W	L	W–L%	Finish	PG	PW	PL	PW–L%	Result
Detroit	2009–10	82	27	55	.329	5th in Central	—	—	—	—	Missed Playoffs
Detroit	2010–11	82	30	52	.366	4th in Central	—	—	—	—	Missed Playoffs
**Career**		164	57	107	.348		—	—	—	—	
