= 1975–76 Illinois State Redbirds men's basketball team =

American college basketball season

1975–76 Illinois State Redbirds men's basketball

Bradley Invitiational champion
- Conference: Independent
- Record: 20–7
- Head coach: Gene Smithson (1st season)
- Assistant coaches: Warren Crews; Ron Ferguson; Bill Flanagan
- Home arena: Horton Field House

1975–76 NCAA Division I men's basketball independents standings
| | Conf. | | | | Overall |
| Team | W | | L | PCT | W | | L | PCT |
|---|---|---|---|---|---|---|---|---|
| No. 4 Rutgers | | – | | – | 31 | – | 2 | .939 |
| No. 3 UNLV | | – | | – | 29 | – | 2 | .935 |
| No. 2 Marquette | | – | | – | 27 | – | 2 | .931 |
| North Texas State | | – | | – | 22 | – | 4 | .846 |
| No. 19 Centenary | | – | | – | 22 | – | 5 | .815 |
| UNC Charlotte | | – | | – | 24 | – | 6 | .800 |
| Pan American | | – | | – | 20 | – | 5 | .800 |
| No. 7 Notre Dame | | – | | – | 23 | – | 6 | .793 |
| St. John's | | – | | – | 23 | – | 6 | .793 |
| Florida State | | – | | – | 21 | – | 6 | .778 |
| Oral Roberts | | – | | – | 20 | – | 6 | .769 |
| Georgetown | | – | | – | 21 | – | 7 | .750 |
| Virginia Tech | | – | | – | 21 | – | 7 | .750 |
| George Washington | | – | | – | 20 | – | 7 | .741 |
| Illinois State | | – | | – | 20 | – | 7 | .741 |
| Creighton | | – | | – | 19 | – | 7 | .731 |
| Northeast Louisiana | | – | | – | 18 | – | 7 | .720 |
| Detroit | | – | | – | 19 | – | 8 | .704 |
| South Florida | | – | | – | 19 | – | 8 | .704 |
| New Orleans | | – | | – | 18 | – | 8 | .692 |
| No. 17 DePaul | | – | | – | 20 | – | 9 | .690 |
| Syracuse | | – | | – | 20 | – | 9 | .690 |
| Holy Cross | | – | | – | 22 | – | 10 | .688 |
| Seton Hall | | – | | – | 18 | – | 9 | .667 |
| South Alabama | | – | | – | 18 | – | 9 | .667 |
| South Carolina | | – | | – | 18 | – | 9 | .667 |
| Providence | | – | | – | 21 | – | 11 | .656 |
| Stetson | | – | | – | 17 | – | 9 | .654 |
| UC Santa Barbara | | – | | – | 17 | – | 9 | .654 |
| Air Force | | – | | – | 16 | – | 9 | .640 |
| VCU | | – | | – | 16 | – | 9 | .640 |
| St. Peter's | | – | | – | 19 | – | 11 | .633 |
| Portland State | | – | | – | 17 | – | 10 | .630 |
| St. Bonaventure | | – | | – | 17 | – | 10 | .630 |
| Mercer | | – | | – | 15 | – | 10 | .600 |
| Villanova | | – | | – | 16 | – | 11 | .593 |
| Niagara | | – | | – | 17 | – | 12 | .586 |
| Long Island | | – | | – | 15 | – | 12 | .556 |
| Colgate | | – | | – | 13 | – | 11 | .542 |
| Xavier | | – | | – | 14 | – | 12 | .538 |
| West Virginia | | – | | – | 15 | – | 13 | .536 |
| Georgia State | | – | | – | 12 | – | 11 | .522 |
| Indiana State | | – | | – | 13 | – | 12 | .520 |
| Dayton | | – | | – | 14 | – | 13 | .519 |
| Hardin–Simmons | | – | | – | 14 | – | 13 | .519 |
| Jacksonville | | – | | – | 13 | – | 13 | .500 |
| Manhattan | | – | | – | 14 | – | 14 | .500 |
| St. Francis (PA) | | – | | – | 14 | – | 14 | .500 |
| St. Francis (NY) | | – | | – | 13 | – | 13 | .500 |
| Marshall | | – | | – | 13 | – | 14 | .481 |
| Duquesne | | – | | – | 12 | – | 13 | .480 |
| Northeastern | | – | | – | 12 | – | 13 | .480 |
| Fairfield | | – | | – | 12 | – | 14 | .462 |
| Utah State | | – | | – | 12 | – | 14 | .462 |
| Butler | | – | | – | 12 | – | 15 | .444 |
| Denver | | – | | – | 12 | – | 15 | .444 |
| Pittsburgh | | – | | – | 12 | – | 15 | .444 |
| Army | | – | | – | 11 | – | 14 | .440 |
| Iona | | – | | – | 11 | – | 15 | .423 |
| Milwaukee | | – | | – | 11 | – | 15 | .423 |
| Southern Miss | | – | | – | 11 | – | 15 | .423 |
| Navy | | – | | – | 10 | – | 14 | .417 |
| Fairleigh Dickinson | | – | | – | 9 | – | 13 | .409 |
| Georgia Southern | | – | | – | 11 | – | 16 | .407 |
| Hawaii | | – | | – | 11 | – | 16 | .407 |
| Penn State | | – | | – | 10 | – | 15 | .400 |
| Buffalo | | – | | – | 10 | – | 16 | .385 |
| Loyola (IL) | | – | | – | 10 | – | 16 | .385 |
| Canisius | | – | | – | 10 | – | 17 | .370 |
| Boston College | | – | | – | 9 | – | 17 | .346 |
| Oklahoma City | | – | | – | 9 | – | 18 | .333 |
| Portland | | – | | – | 9 | – | 18 | .333 |
| Fordham | | – | | – | 7 | – | 19 | .269 |
| Cleveland State | | – | | – | 6 | – | 19 | .240 |
| Houston Baptist | | – | | – | 5 | – | 21 | .192 |
| Baptist | | – | | – | 3 | – | 23 | .115 |
| Samford | | – | | – | 3 | – | 23 | .115 |
Rankings from AP Poll

The 1975–76 Illinois State Redbirds men's basketball team represented Illinois State University during the 1975–76 NCAA Division I men's basketball season. The Redbirds, led by first-year head coach Gene Smithson, played their home games at Horton Field House in Normal, Illinois and competed as an independent (not a member of a conference). They finished the season with a 20–7 record.

== Roster ==
1975–76 Illinois State Redbirds men's basketball team
Players
Coaches

| Pos. | # | Name | Height | Weight | Year | Hometown |
|---|---|---|---|---|---|---|
| G | 23 | Mike Bonczyk | 5 ft 10 in (1.78 m) | 170 lb (77 kg) | Sr | South Holland, IL |
| F | 42 | Randy Henry | 6 ft 8 in (2.03 m) | 185 lb (84 kg) | Sr | Detroit, MI |
| F | 35 | Rich Jones | 6 ft 3 in (1.91 m) | 190 lb (86 kg) | Sr | York, AL |
| F | 43 | Roger Powell | 6 ft 5 in (1.96 m) | 193 lb (88 kg) | Sr | Joliet, IL |
| G | 13 | George Tometich | 6 ft 2 in (1.88 m) | 170 lb (77 kg) | Sr | Moline, IL |
| F | 24 | John Crossen | 6 ft 6 in (1.98 m) | 200 lb (91 kg) | Jr | St. Clair Shores, MI |
| F | 34 | Jeff Widdel | 6 ft 6 in (1.98 m) | 205 lb (93 kg) | Jr | Rock Island, IL |
| C | 45 | Jeff Wilkins | 7 ft 0 in (2.13 m) | 240 lb (109 kg) | Jr | Chicago, IL |
| F | 25 | Billy Lewis | 6 ft 6 in (1.98 m) | 180 lb (82 kg) | So | Chicago, IL |
| G | 31 | Rick Ferina | 6 ft 4 in (1.93 m) | 180 lb (82 kg) | Fr | Niles, IL |
| F | 21 | Derrick Mayes | 6 ft 1 in (1.85 m) | 170 lb (77 kg) | Fr | Elgin, IL |

Head coach

- Gene Smithson (North Central (IL))

Assistant coach(es)

- Warren Crews (Southeast Missouri State)
- Ron Ferguson (Illinois)
- Bill Flanagan (Monmouth (IL))

Legend

- (C) Team captain
- (S) Suspended
- (I) Ineligible
- (W) Walk-on
- Injured
- Current redshirt

Roster
Last update: January 29, 2021

== Schedule ==
| Date time, TV | Rank^{#} | Opponent^{#} | Result | Record | High points | High rebounds | High assists | Site (attendance) city, state |
Regular season
| November 28, 1975*; 7:30 pm | | Lewis | W 129–72 | 1–0 | – | – | – | Horton Field House; Normal, IL |
| December 3, 1975*; 7:00 pm | | at Long Island | W 100–78 | 2–0 | – | – | – | Arnold & Marie Schwartz Athletic Center; Brooklyn, NY |
| December 10, 1975*; 7:00 pm | | at Butler | W 81–75 | 3–0 | – | – | – | Hinkle Fieldhouse; Indianapolis, IN |
| December 13, 1975*; 7:30 pm | | Alabama–Huntsville | W 84–66 | 4–0 | – | – | – | Horton Field House; Normal, IL |
| December 19, 1975* | | vs. Eastern Illinois; Bradley Invitiational [Semifinal] | W 80–77 | 5–0 | – | – | – | Robertson Memorial Field House; Peoria, IL |
| December 20, 1975* | | at Bradley; Bradley Invitiational [Final] | W 88–83 | 6–0 | – | – | – | Robertson Memorial Field House; Peoria, IL |
| December 23, 1975*; 7:30 pm | | No. 19 Centenary | L 72–76 | 6–1 | – | – | – | Horton Field House; Normal, IL |
| December 27, 1975*; 7:30 pm | | Idaho State | W 87–77 | 7–1 | – | – | – | Horton Field House; Normal, IL |
| December 30, 1975*; 7:35 pm | | at Drake | L 73–84 | 7–2 | – | – | – | Veterans Memorial Auditorium; Des Moines, IA |
| January 3, 1976*; 10:05 pm | | at Washington State | L 71–76 | 7–3 | – | – | – | Performing Arts Coliseum; Pullman, WA |
| January 5, 1976*; 10:00 pm | | at Idaho | L 60–61 ^{OT} | 7–4 | – | – | – | War Memorial Gymnasium; Moscow, ID |
| January 8, 1976*; 7:30 pm | | Western Illinois | W 92–79 | 8–4 | – | – | – | Horton Field House; Normal, IL |
| January 10, 1976*; 7:30 pm | | Oral Roberts | W 75–70 | 9–4 | – | – | – | Horton Field House; Normal, IL |
| January 13, 1976*; 7:30 pm | | Northern Iowa | W 102–66 | 10–4 | – | – | – | Horton Field House; Normal, IL |
| January 21, 1976*; 6:30 pm | | at Indiana State | W 72–63 | 11–4 | – | – | – | Hulman Civic University Center; Terre Haute, IN |
| January 24, 1976*; 7:00 pm | | at No. 14 Wake Forest | W 81–79 | 12–4 | – | 20 – Wilkins | – | Winston–Salem Memorial Coliseum; Winston–Salem, NC |
| January 26, 1976*; 7:30 pm | | Marshall | W 83–64 | 13–4 | – | – | – | Horton Field House; Normal, IL |
| January 31, 1976*; 7:30 pm | | at Oral Roberts | L 75–89 | 13–5 | – | – | – | Mabee Center; Tulsa, OK |
| February 2, 1976*; 7:30 pm | | Florida State | W 82–80 ^{OT} | 14–5 | – | – | – | Horton Field House; Normal, IL |
| February 7, 1976*; 7:30 pm | | Southern Illinois–Edwardsville | W 68–59 | 15–5 | – | – | – | Horton Field House; Normal, IL |
| February 12, 1976*; 6:30 pm | | at Florida State | L 81–109 | 15–6 | – | – | – | Bobby Tully Gymnasium; Tallahassee, FL |
| February 14, 1976*; 7:30 pm | | at Louisiana Tech | W 76–72 | 16–6 | – | – | – | Memorial Gymnasium; Ruston, LA |
| February 16, 1976*; 7:30 pm | | Central Michigan | W 95–80 | 17–6 | – | – | – | Horton Field House; Normal, IL |
| February 20, 1976*; 7:30 pm | | Wisconsin–Milwaukee | W 106–82 | 18–6 | – | – | – | Horton Field House; Normal, IL |
| February 23, 1976*; 8:30 pm | | at Saint Louis | L 71–85 | 18–7 | – | – | – | Kiel Auditorium; St. Louis, MO |
| February 28, 1976*; 7:30 pm | | McNeese State | W 106–80 | 19–7 | – | – | – | Horton Field House; Normal, IL |
| March 1, 1976*; 7:30 pm | | Akron | W 88–69 | 20–7 | – | – | – | Horton Field House; Normal, IL |
*Non-conference game. ^{#}Rankings from AP Poll. (#) Tournament seedings in parentheses. All times are in Central Standard Time.
