= 1975–76 Penn State Nittany Lions basketball team =

American college basketball season

1975–76 Penn State Nittany Lions men's basketball
- Conference: Independent
- Record: 10-15
- Head coach: Johnny Bach (8th season)
- Home arena: Rec Hall

1975–76 NCAA Division I men's basketball independents standings
	Conf.				Overall
Team	W		L	PCT	W		L	PCT
No. 4 Rutgers		–		–	31	–	2	.939
No. 3 UNLV		–		–	29	–	2	.935
No. 2 Marquette		–		–	27	–	2	.931
North Texas State		–		–	22	–	4	.846
No. 19 Centenary		–		–	22	–	5	.815
UNC Charlotte		–		–	24	–	6	.800
Pan American		–		–	20	–	5	.800
No. 7 Notre Dame		–		–	23	–	6	.793
St. John's		–		–	23	–	6	.793
Florida State		–		–	21	–	6	.778
Oral Roberts		–		–	20	–	6	.769
Georgetown		–		–	21	–	7	.750
Virginia Tech		–		–	21	–	7	.750
George Washington		–		–	20	–	7	.741
Illinois State		–		–	20	–	7	.741
Creighton		–		–	19	–	7	.731
Northeast Louisiana		–		–	18	–	7	.720
Detroit		–		–	19	–	8	.704
South Florida		–		–	19	–	8	.704
New Orleans		–		–	18	–	8	.692
No. 17 DePaul		–		–	20	–	9	.690
Syracuse		–		–	20	–	9	.690
Holy Cross		–		–	22	–	10	.688
Seton Hall		–		–	18	–	9	.667
South Alabama		–		–	18	–	9	.667
South Carolina		–		–	18	–	9	.667
Providence		–		–	21	–	11	.656
Stetson		–		–	17	–	9	.654
UC Santa Barbara		–		–	17	–	9	.654
Air Force		–		–	16	–	9	.640
VCU		–		–	16	–	9	.640
St. Peter's		–		–	19	–	11	.633
Portland State		–		–	17	–	10	.630
St. Bonaventure		–		–	17	–	10	.630
Mercer		–		–	15	–	10	.600
Villanova		–		–	16	–	11	.593
Niagara		–		–	17	–	12	.586
Long Island		–		–	15	–	12	.556
Colgate		–		–	13	–	11	.542
Xavier		–		–	14	–	12	.538
West Virginia		–		–	15	–	13	.536
Georgia State		–		–	12	–	11	.522
Indiana State		–		–	13	–	12	.520
Dayton		–		–	14	–	13	.519
Hardin–Simmons		–		–	14	–	13	.519
Jacksonville		–		–	13	–	13	.500
Manhattan		–		–	14	–	14	.500
St. Francis (PA)		–		–	14	–	14	.500
St. Francis (NY)		–		–	13	–	13	.500
Marshall		–		–	13	–	14	.481
Duquesne		–		–	12	–	13	.480
Northeastern		–		–	12	–	13	.480
Fairfield		–		–	12	–	14	.462
Utah State		–		–	12	–	14	.462
Butler		–		–	12	–	15	.444
Denver		–		–	12	–	15	.444
Pittsburgh		–		–	12	–	15	.444
Army		–		–	11	–	14	.440
Iona		–		–	11	–	15	.423
Milwaukee		–		–	11	–	15	.423
Southern Miss		–		–	11	–	15	.423
Navy		–		–	10	–	14	.417
Fairleigh Dickinson		–		–	9	–	13	.409
Georgia Southern		–		–	11	–	16	.407
Hawaii		–		–	11	–	16	.407
Penn State		–		–	10	–	15	.400
Buffalo		–		–	10	–	16	.385
Loyola (IL)		–		–	10	–	16	.385
Canisius		–		–	10	–	17	.370
Boston College		–		–	9	–	17	.346
Oklahoma City		–		–	9	–	18	.333
Portland		–		–	9	–	18	.333
Fordham		–		–	7	–	19	.269
Cleveland State		–		–	6	–	19	.240
Houston Baptist		–		–	5	–	21	.192
Baptist		–		–	3	–	23	.115
Samford		–		–	3	–	23	.115
Rankings from AP Poll

The 1975-76 Penn State Nittany Lions men's basketball team represented the Pennsylvania State University during the 1975-76 NCAA Division I men's basketball season. The team was led by 8th-year head coach Johnny Bach, and played their home games at Rec Hall in University Park, Pennsylvania.

== Schedule ==
Date time, TV	Rank^{#}	Opponent^{#}	Result	Record	Site city, state
December 2		at Lehigh	W 93–45	1–0	Taylor Gym
December 4		Delaware	W 66–61	2–0	Rec Hall; University Park, Pennsylvania
December 7		Ohio State	W 74–68	3–0	Rec Hall; University Park, Pennsylvania
December 9		Virginia	L 66–79	3–1	Rec Hall; University Park, Pennsylvania
December 16		Kent State	W 65–63	4–1	Rec Hall; University Park, Pennsylvania
December 19		at Syracuse	L 82–90	4–2	Manley Field House; Syracuse, NY
December 20		at Colgate	W 70–54	5–2	Cotterell Court; Hamilton, NY
December 26		at No. 20 Minnesota	L 70–86	5–3	Williams Arena; Minneapolis, Minnesota
December 27		vs. Butler	L 50–63	5–4	
January 2		vs. Harvard	W 63–55	6–4	
January 3		at George Washington	L 69–78	6–5	Charles E. Smith Center; Washington, D. C.
January 11		at Saint Francis (PA)	W 79–68	7–5	Maurice Stokes Athletic Center
January 14		at Bucknell	L 64–69	7–6	Davis Gym
January 17		Muhlenberg	W 91–61	8–6	Rec Hall; University Park, Pennsylvania
January 19		Gettysburg	W 88–54	9–6	Rec Hall; University Park, Pennsylvania
January 24		West Virginia	L 64–69	9–7	Rec Hall; University Park, Pennsylvania
January 27		at Georgetown	L 63–71	9–8	McDonough Gymnasium
January 30		at Duquesne	L 70–76	9–9	Civic Arena; Pittsburgh, Pennsylvania
January 31		at Pittsburgh	L 52–71	9–10	Fitzgerald Fieldhouse; Pittsburgh, Pennsylvania
February 4		Temple	L 76–77	9–11	Rec Hall; University Park, Pennsylvania
February 11		Syracuse	L 93–100	9–12	Rec Hall; University Park, Pennsylvania
February 14		at Navy	L 81–83	9–13	Dahlgren Hall
February 18		at West Virginia	L 87–103	9–14	WVU Coliseum
February 21		Pittsburgh	L 61–65	9–15	Rec Hall; University Park, Pennsylvania
February 28		vs. Fairfield	W 76–68	10–15	
*Non-conference game. ^{#}Rankings from AP Poll. (#) Tournament seedings in parentheses.
