= 1975–76 Yale Bulldogs men's basketball team =

American college basketball season

1975–76 Yale Bulldogs men's basketball
- Conference: Ivy League
- Record: 7–21 (5–9 Ivy)
- Head coach: Ray Carazo (1st season)
- Home arena: John J. Lee Amphitheater

1975–76 Ivy League men's basketball standings
| | Conf. | | | | Overall |
| Team | W | | L | PCT | W | | L | PCT |
|---|---|---|---|---|---|---|---|---|
| Princeton | 14 | – | 0 | 1.000 | 22 | – | 5 | .815 |
| Penn | 11 | – | 3 | .786 | 17 | – | 9 | .654 |
| Dartmouth | 7 | – | 7 | .500 | 16 | – | 10 | .615 |
| Columbia | 6 | – | 8 | .429 | 8 | – | 17 | .320 |
| Brown | 6 | – | 8 | .429 | 7 | – | 19 | .269 |
| Yale | 5 | – | 9 | .357 | 7 | – | 21 | .250 |
| Cornell | 4 | – | 10 | .286 | 8 | – | 18 | .308 |
| Harvard | 3 | – | 11 | .214 | 8 | – | 18 | .308 |
Rankings from AP Poll

The 1975–76 Yale Bulldogs men's basketball team represented Yale University during the 1975–76 men's college basketball season. The Bulldogs, led by 1st year head coach Ray Carazo, played their home games at John J. Lee Amphitheater of the Payne Whitney Gymnasium and were members of the Ivy League. They finished the season 7–21, 5–9 in Ivy League play to finish in last place.

== Schedule ==
| Date time, TV | Rank^{#} | Opponent^{#} | Result | Record | Site city, state |
|---|---|---|---|---|---|
| December 1* | | Williams | W 79–49 | 1–0 | Payne Whitney Gymnasium; New Haven, CT |
| December 3* | | Fordham | L 47–49 | 1–1 | Payne Whitney Gymnasium; New Haven, CT |
| December 6* | | at Connecticut | L 59–71 | 1–2 | Hugh S. Greer Field House; Storrs, CT |
| December 9 | | Brown | L 60–62 | 1–3 (0–1) | Payne Whitney Gymnasium; New Haven, CT |
| December 19 | | at Kansas | L 54–63 | 1–4 (0–1) | Allen Fieldhouse; Lawrence, KS |
| December 20 | | vs. Texas A&M | L 62–71 | 1–5 (0–1) | Allen Fieldhouse; Lawrence, KS |
| December 22 | | at South Carolina | L 66–100 | 1–6 (0–1) | Carolina Coliseum; Columbia, SC |
| December 23 | | vs. Virginia | L 62–72 | 1–7 (0–1) | Carolina Coliseum; Columbia, SC |
| December 26 | | at Hawaii | L 60–76 | 1–8 (0–1) | Neal S. Blaisdell Center; Honolulu, Hawaii |
| December 27 | | vs. St. Peter’s | L 61–66 | 1–9 (0–1) | Neal S. Blaisdell Center; Honolulu, Hawaii |
| December 28 | | vs. Cincinnati | L 55–83 | 1–10 (0–1) | Neal S. Blaisdell Center; Honolulu, Hawaii |
| January 5* | | at North Carolina | L 42–81 | 1–11 (0–1) | Carmichael Arena; Chapel Hill, NC |
| January 9 | | at Brown | W 52–45 | 2–11 (1–1) | Marvel Gymnasium; Providence, RI |
| January 17* | | at Amherst | W 59–53 | 3–11 (1–1) | |
| January 20* | | Holy Cross | L 57–61 ^{OT} | 3–12 (1–1) | Payne Whitney Gymnasium; New Haven, CT |
| January 24* | | at Boston College | L 56–70 | 3–13 (1–1) | Roberts Center; Chestnut Hill, Massachusetts |
| January 30 | | Columbia | L 57–70 | 3–14 (1–2) | Payne Whitney Gymnasium; New Haven, CT |
| January 31 | | Cornell | W 74–61 | 4–14 (2–2) | Payne Whitney Gymnasium; New Haven, CT |
| February 6 | | at Dartmouth | L 54–76 | 4–15 (2–3) | Alumni Gym; Hanover, NH |
| February 7 | | at Harvard | L 63–73 | 4–16 (2–4) | Lavietes Pavilion; Boston, Massachusetts |
| February 13 | | Penn | L 53–73 | 4–17 (2–5) | Payne Whitney Gymnasium; New Haven, CT |
| February 14 | | Princeton | L 48–49 | 4–18 (2–6) | Payne Whitney Gymnasium; New Haven, CT |
| February 20 | | at Cornell | L 59–68 | 4–19 (2–7) | Barton Hall; Ithaca, NY |
| February 21 | | at Columbia | L 75–76 ^{OT} | 4–20 (2–8) | Levien Gymnasium; Manhattan, NY |
| February 27 | | at Princeton | L 53–68 | 4–21 (2–9) | Jadwin Gymnasium; Princeton, NJ |
| February 28 | | at Penn | W 46–44 | 5–21 (3–9) | Palestra; Philadelphia, Pennsylvania |
| March 5 | | Harvard | W 63–62 | 6–21 (4–9) | Payne Whitney Gymnasium; New Haven, CT |
| March 6 | | Dartmouth | W 54–52 | 7–21 (5–9) | Payne Whitney Gymnasium; New Haven, CT |
*Non-conference game. ^{#}Rankings from AP Poll. (#) Tournament seedings in parentheses.
