= 1975–76 Syracuse Orangemen basketball team =

American college basketball season

1975–76 Syracuse Orangemen basketball

NCAA Men's Division I Tournament, First Round
- Conference: Independent
- Record: 20–9
- Head coach: Roy Danforth
- Home arena: Manley Field House

1975–76 NCAA Division I men's basketball independents standings
	Conf.				Overall
Team	W		L	PCT	W		L	PCT
No. 4 Rutgers		–		–	31	–	2	.939
No. 3 UNLV		–		–	29	–	2	.935
No. 2 Marquette		–		–	27	–	2	.931
North Texas State		–		–	22	–	4	.846
No. 19 Centenary		–		–	22	–	5	.815
UNC Charlotte		–		–	24	–	6	.800
Pan American		–		–	20	–	5	.800
No. 7 Notre Dame		–		–	23	–	6	.793
St. John's		–		–	23	–	6	.793
Florida State		–		–	21	–	6	.778
Oral Roberts		–		–	20	–	6	.769
Georgetown		–		–	21	–	7	.750
Virginia Tech		–		–	21	–	7	.750
George Washington		–		–	20	–	7	.741
Illinois State		–		–	20	–	7	.741
Creighton		–		–	19	–	7	.731
Northeast Louisiana		–		–	18	–	7	.720
Detroit		–		–	19	–	8	.704
South Florida		–		–	19	–	8	.704
New Orleans		–		–	18	–	8	.692
No. 17 DePaul		–		–	20	–	9	.690
Syracuse		–		–	20	–	9	.690
Holy Cross		–		–	22	–	10	.688
Seton Hall		–		–	18	–	9	.667
South Alabama		–		–	18	–	9	.667
South Carolina		–		–	18	–	9	.667
Providence		–		–	21	–	11	.656
Stetson		–		–	17	–	9	.654
UC Santa Barbara		–		–	17	–	9	.654
Air Force		–		–	16	–	9	.640
VCU		–		–	16	–	9	.640
St. Peter's		–		–	19	–	11	.633
Portland State		–		–	17	–	10	.630
St. Bonaventure		–		–	17	–	10	.630
Mercer		–		–	15	–	10	.600
Villanova		–		–	16	–	11	.593
Niagara		–		–	17	–	12	.586
Long Island		–		–	15	–	12	.556
Colgate		–		–	13	–	11	.542
Xavier		–		–	14	–	12	.538
West Virginia		–		–	15	–	13	.536
Georgia State		–		–	12	–	11	.522
Indiana State		–		–	13	–	12	.520
Dayton		–		–	14	–	13	.519
Hardin–Simmons		–		–	14	–	13	.519
Jacksonville		–		–	13	–	13	.500
Manhattan		–		–	14	–	14	.500
St. Francis (PA)		–		–	14	–	14	.500
St. Francis (NY)		–		–	13	–	13	.500
Marshall		–		–	13	–	14	.481
Duquesne		–		–	12	–	13	.480
Northeastern		–		–	12	–	13	.480
Fairfield		–		–	12	–	14	.462
Utah State		–		–	12	–	14	.462
Butler		–		–	12	–	15	.444
Denver		–		–	12	–	15	.444
Pittsburgh		–		–	12	–	15	.444
Army		–		–	11	–	14	.440
Iona		–		–	11	–	15	.423
Milwaukee		–		–	11	–	15	.423
Southern Miss		–		–	11	–	15	.423
Navy		–		–	10	–	14	.417
Fairleigh Dickinson		–		–	9	–	13	.409
Georgia Southern		–		–	11	–	16	.407
Hawaii		–		–	11	–	16	.407
Penn State		–		–	10	–	15	.400
Buffalo		–		–	10	–	16	.385
Loyola (IL)		–		–	10	–	16	.385
Canisius		–		–	10	–	17	.370
Boston College		–		–	9	–	17	.346
Oklahoma City		–		–	9	–	18	.333
Portland		–		–	9	–	18	.333
Fordham		–		–	7	–	19	.269
Cleveland State		–		–	6	–	19	.240
Houston Baptist		–		–	5	–	21	.192
Baptist		–		–	3	–	23	.115
Samford		–		–	3	–	23	.115
Rankings from AP Poll

The 1975–76 Syracuse Orangemen men's basketball team represented Syracuse University in NCAA Division I men's competition in the 1975–76 academic year.

Coach Roy Danforth left the Orangemen following the season to become head coach at Tulane of the Metro Conference. Danforth was succeeded by Jim Boeheim, who remained in the position for 47 seasons.

== Schedule ==
Date time, TV	Rank^{#}	Opponent^{#}	Result	Record	Site city, state
November 28		vs. Austin Peay	L 83–93	0–1	
November 29		vs. Harvard	W 83–70	1–1	
December 3		Buffalo	W 87–77	2–1	Manley Field House; Syracuse, NY
December 5		vs. UNLV	L 83–105	2–2	Civic Arena; Pittsburgh, Pennsylvania
December 6		at Pittsburgh	W 90–80	3–2	Civic Arena; Pittsburgh, Pennsylvania
December 10		St. Bonaventure	W 96–84	4–2	Manley Field House; Syracuse, NY
December 19		Penn State	W 90–82	5–2	Manley Field House; Syracuse, NY
December 20		Boston College	W 59–58	6–2	Manley Field House; Syracuse, NY
December 30		Dayton	W 84–74	7–2	Manley Field House; Syracuse, NY
January 3		at West Virginia	L 75–97	7–3	WVU Coliseum; Morgantown, WV
January 7		Fordham	W 55–48	8–3	Manley Field House; Syracuse, NY
January 10		at La Salle	W 82–77	9–3	Palestra; Philadelphia, Pennsylvania
January 13		Cornell	W 87–72	10–3	Manley Field House; Syracuse, NY
January 17		at American	W 65–61	11–3	Fort Myer Ceremonial Hall; Arlington, Virginia
January 21		Canisius	W 80–51	12–3	Manley Field House; Syracuse, NY
January 24		Northeastern	W 87–75	13–3	Manley Field House; Syracuse, NY
January 28		Temple	W 56–51	14–3	Manley Field House; Syracuse, NY
February 4		at Bowling Green State	W 100–75	15–3	Anderson Arena; Bowling Green, Ohio
February 7		at Pittsburgh	L 67–71	15–4	Fitzgerald Field House; Pittsburgh, Pennsylvania
February 11		at Penn State	W 100–93	16–4	Rec Hall; University Park, Pennsylvania
February 14		at Colgate	W 77–68	17–4	Cotterell Court; Hamilton, NY
February 16		Stonehill	W 101–55	18–4	Manley Field House; Syracuse, NY
February 18		at Rutgers	L 80–93	18–5	College Avenue Gymnasium; New Brunswick, NJ
February 21		at St. John's	L 78–100	18–6	Carnesecca Arena; Queens, NY
February 25		at Niagara	L 57–59	18–7	Niagara Falls Convention and Civic Center; Niagara Falls, NY
February 28		Virginia Tech	L 81–92	18–8	Manley Field House; Syracuse, NY
March 5		Manhattan	W 83–57	19–8	Manley Field House; Syracuse, NY
March 6		Niagara	W 77–68	20–8	Manley Field House; Syracuse, NY
March 13		vs. Texas Tech; NCAA Tournament • First Round	L 59–69	20–9	UNT Coliseum; Denton, Texas
*Non-conference game. ^{#}Rankings from AP Poll. (#) Tournament seedings in parentheses.
