= 1975–76 Marquette Warriors men's basketball team =

American college basketball season

1975–76 Marquette Warriors men's basketball

NCAA Men's Division I Tournament, Elite Eight
- Conference: Independent

Ranking
- Coaches: No. 2
- AP: No. 2
- Record: 27–2
- Head coach: Al McGuire
- Home arena: MECCA Arena

1975–76 NCAA Division I men's basketball independents standings
	Conf.				Overall
Team	W		L	PCT	W		L	PCT
No. 4 Rutgers		–		–	31	–	2	.939
No. 3 UNLV		–		–	29	–	2	.935
No. 2 Marquette		–		–	27	–	2	.931
North Texas State		–		–	22	–	4	.846
No. 19 Centenary		–		–	22	–	5	.815
UNC Charlotte		–		–	24	–	6	.800
Pan American		–		–	20	–	5	.800
No. 7 Notre Dame		–		–	23	–	6	.793
St. John's		–		–	23	–	6	.793
Florida State		–		–	21	–	6	.778
Oral Roberts		–		–	20	–	6	.769
Georgetown		–		–	21	–	7	.750
Virginia Tech		–		–	21	–	7	.750
George Washington		–		–	20	–	7	.741
Illinois State		–		–	20	–	7	.741
Creighton		–		–	19	–	7	.731
Northeast Louisiana		–		–	18	–	7	.720
Detroit		–		–	19	–	8	.704
South Florida		–		–	19	–	8	.704
New Orleans		–		–	18	–	8	.692
No. 17 DePaul		–		–	20	–	9	.690
Syracuse		–		–	20	–	9	.690
Holy Cross		–		–	22	–	10	.688
Seton Hall		–		–	18	–	9	.667
South Alabama		–		–	18	–	9	.667
South Carolina		–		–	18	–	9	.667
Providence		–		–	21	–	11	.656
Stetson		–		–	17	–	9	.654
UC Santa Barbara		–		–	17	–	9	.654
Air Force		–		–	16	–	9	.640
VCU		–		–	16	–	9	.640
St. Peter's		–		–	19	–	11	.633
Portland State		–		–	17	–	10	.630
St. Bonaventure		–		–	17	–	10	.630
Mercer		–		–	15	–	10	.600
Villanova		–		–	16	–	11	.593
Niagara		–		–	17	–	12	.586
Long Island		–		–	15	–	12	.556
Colgate		–		–	13	–	11	.542
Xavier		–		–	14	–	12	.538
West Virginia		–		–	15	–	13	.536
Georgia State		–		–	12	–	11	.522
Indiana State		–		–	13	–	12	.520
Dayton		–		–	14	–	13	.519
Hardin–Simmons		–		–	14	–	13	.519
Jacksonville		–		–	13	–	13	.500
Manhattan		–		–	14	–	14	.500
St. Francis (PA)		–		–	14	–	14	.500
St. Francis (NY)		–		–	13	–	13	.500
Marshall		–		–	13	–	14	.481
Duquesne		–		–	12	–	13	.480
Northeastern		–		–	12	–	13	.480
Fairfield		–		–	12	–	14	.462
Utah State		–		–	12	–	14	.462
Butler		–		–	12	–	15	.444
Denver		–		–	12	–	15	.444
Pittsburgh		–		–	12	–	15	.444
Army		–		–	11	–	14	.440
Iona		–		–	11	–	15	.423
Milwaukee		–		–	11	–	15	.423
Southern Miss		–		–	11	–	15	.423
Navy		–		–	10	–	14	.417
Fairleigh Dickinson		–		–	9	–	13	.409
Georgia Southern		–		–	11	–	16	.407
Hawaii		–		–	11	–	16	.407
Penn State		–		–	10	–	15	.400
Buffalo		–		–	10	–	16	.385
Loyola (IL)		–		–	10	–	16	.385
Canisius		–		–	10	–	17	.370
Boston College		–		–	9	–	17	.346
Oklahoma City		–		–	9	–	18	.333
Portland		–		–	9	–	18	.333
Fordham		–		–	7	–	19	.269
Cleveland State		–		–	6	–	19	.240
Houston Baptist		–		–	5	–	21	.192
Baptist		–		–	3	–	23	.115
Samford		–		–	3	–	23	.115
Rankings from AP Poll

The 1975–76 Marquette Warriors men's basketball team represented Marquette University in NCAA Division I men's competition in the 1975–76 academic year.

At that time, Marquette was an independent school not aligned with any conference; it did not join a conference until 1988, when it joined the Midwestern Collegiate Conference, now known as the Horizon League; it would later move to the Great Midwest Conference and Conference USA before joining its current conference, the Big East, in 2005. Also, Marquette did not adopt its current nickname of "Golden Eagles" until 1994.

== Roster ==
1975–76 Marquette Warriors men's basketball team
Players
Coaches

Pos.	#	Name	Height	Weight	Year	Hometown
G	10	Barry Brennan	5 ft 10 in (1.78 m)	150 lb (68 kg)	Sr	Charlotte, North Carolina
C	30	Craig Butrym	6 ft 11 in (2.11 m)	185 lb (84 kg)	Jr	Fox Point, Wisconsin
F	31	Bo Ellis	6 ft 9 in (2.06 m)	190 lb (86 kg)	Jr	Chicago, Illinois
G	15	Butch Lee	6 ft 1 in (1.85 m)	185 lb (84 kg)	So	The Bronx, New York
F	42	Bill Neary	6 ft 5 in (1.96 m)	185 lb (84 kg)	Jr	Wauwatosa, Wisconsin
F	21	Ulice Payne	6 ft 6 in (1.98 m)	185 lb (84 kg)	So	Donora, Pennsylvania
G	55	Gary Rosenberger	6 ft 0 in (1.83 m)	155 lb (70 kg)	So	Milwaukee, Wisconsin
G	43	Earl Tatum	6 ft 5 in (1.96 m)	185 lb (84 kg)	Sr	Mount Vernon, New York
F	33	Bernard Toone	6 ft 9 in (2.06 m)	210 lb (95 kg)	Fr	Yonkers, New York
G	22	Lloyd Walton	6 ft 0 in (1.83 m)	160 lb (73 kg)	Sr	Chicago, Illinois
C	54	Jerome Whitehead	6 ft 10 in (2.08 m)	220 lb (100 kg)	So	Waukegan, Illinois

Head coach

- Al McGuire

Assistant coach(es)

- Hank Raymonds
- Rick Majerus

Legend

- (C) Team captain
- (S) Suspended
- (I) Ineligible
- (W) Walk-on
- Injured
- Current redshirt

== Schedule ==
Date time, TV	Rank^{#}	Opponent^{#}	Result	Record	Site city, state
December 2		St. Joseph (IN)	W 87–60	1–0	MECCA Arena; Milwaukee, WI
December 6		Northern Michigan	W 56–45	2–0	MECCA Arena; Milwaukee, WI
December 13		Drake	W 80–58	3–0	MECCA Arena; Milwaukee, WI
December 16	No. 7	Wisconsin	W 78–54	4–0	MECCA Arena; Milwaukee, WI
December 18		at Minnesota	L 73–77	4–1	Williams Arena; Minneapolis, Minnesota
December 20	No. 3	Northwestern	W 75–53	5–1	MECCA Arena; Milwaukee, WI
December 29		Miami (OH)	W 75–52	6–1	MECCA Arena; Milwaukee, WI
December 30	No. 4	Wisconsin; Milwaukee Classic	W 82–66	7–1	MECCA Arena; Milwaukee, WI
January 3		South Carolina	W 82–70	8–1	MECCA Arena; Milwaukee, WI
February 28		No. 6 Notre Dame	W 81–75	23–1	Joyce Center; South Bend, IN
NCAA Tournament
March 13*	No. 2	vs. Western Kentucky; First Round	W 79–60	26–1	UD Arena; Dayton, OH
March 18*	No. 2	vs. No. 10 Western Michigan; Sweet Sixteen	W 62–57	27–1	LSU Assembly Center (14,150); Baton Rouge, LA
March 20*	No. 2	vs. No. 1 Indiana; Elite Eight	L 56–65	27–2	LSU Assembly Center; Baton Rouge, LA
*Non-conference game. ^{#}Rankings from AP Poll. (#) Tournament seedings in parentheses.

== NCAA basketball tournament ==
- West
  - Marquette 79, Western Kentucky 60
  - Marquette 62, Western Michigan 57
  - Indiana 65, Marquette 56

== Team players drafted into the NBA ==
Round	Pick	Player	NBA club
2	21	Earl Tatum	Los Angeles Lakers
3	40	Lloyd Walton	Milwaukee Bucks
