= 1975–76 Notre Dame Fighting Irish men's basketball team =

American college basketball season

1975–76 Notre Dame Fighting Irish men's basketball

NCAA Tournament, Second Round
- Conference: Independent

Ranking
- Coaches: No. 8
- AP: No. 7
- Record: 23–6
- Head coach: Digger Phelps (5th season)
- Home arena: Joyce Center

1975–76 NCAA Division I men's basketball independents standings
	Conf.				Overall
Team	W		L	PCT	W		L	PCT
No. 4 Rutgers		–		–	31	–	2	.939
No. 3 UNLV		–		–	29	–	2	.935
No. 2 Marquette		–		–	27	–	2	.931
North Texas State		–		–	22	–	4	.846
No. 19 Centenary		–		–	22	–	5	.815
UNC Charlotte		–		–	24	–	6	.800
Pan American		–		–	20	–	5	.800
No. 7 Notre Dame		–		–	23	–	6	.793
St. John's		–		–	23	–	6	.793
Florida State		–		–	21	–	6	.778
Oral Roberts		–		–	20	–	6	.769
Georgetown		–		–	21	–	7	.750
Virginia Tech		–		–	21	–	7	.750
George Washington		–		–	20	–	7	.741
Illinois State		–		–	20	–	7	.741
Creighton		–		–	19	–	7	.731
Northeast Louisiana		–		–	18	–	7	.720
Detroit		–		–	19	–	8	.704
South Florida		–		–	19	–	8	.704
New Orleans		–		–	18	–	8	.692
No. 17 DePaul		–		–	20	–	9	.690
Syracuse		–		–	20	–	9	.690
Holy Cross		–		–	22	–	10	.688
Seton Hall		–		–	18	–	9	.667
South Alabama		–		–	18	–	9	.667
South Carolina		–		–	18	–	9	.667
Providence		–		–	21	–	11	.656
Stetson		–		–	17	–	9	.654
UC Santa Barbara		–		–	17	–	9	.654
Air Force		–		–	16	–	9	.640
VCU		–		–	16	–	9	.640
St. Peter's		–		–	19	–	11	.633
Portland State		–		–	17	–	10	.630
St. Bonaventure		–		–	17	–	10	.630
Mercer		–		–	15	–	10	.600
Villanova		–		–	16	–	11	.593
Niagara		–		–	17	–	12	.586
Long Island		–		–	15	–	12	.556
Colgate		–		–	13	–	11	.542
Xavier		–		–	14	–	12	.538
West Virginia		–		–	15	–	13	.536
Georgia State		–		–	12	–	11	.522
Indiana State		–		–	13	–	12	.520
Dayton		–		–	14	–	13	.519
Hardin–Simmons		–		–	14	–	13	.519
Jacksonville		–		–	13	–	13	.500
Manhattan		–		–	14	–	14	.500
St. Francis (PA)		–		–	14	–	14	.500
St. Francis (NY)		–		–	13	–	13	.500
Marshall		–		–	13	–	14	.481
Duquesne		–		–	12	–	13	.480
Northeastern		–		–	12	–	13	.480
Fairfield		–		–	12	–	14	.462
Utah State		–		–	12	–	14	.462
Butler		–		–	12	–	15	.444
Denver		–		–	12	–	15	.444
Pittsburgh		–		–	12	–	15	.444
Army		–		–	11	–	14	.440
Iona		–		–	11	–	15	.423
Milwaukee		–		–	11	–	15	.423
Southern Miss		–		–	11	–	15	.423
Navy		–		–	10	–	14	.417
Fairleigh Dickinson		–		–	9	–	13	.409
Georgia Southern		–		–	11	–	16	.407
Hawaii		–		–	11	–	16	.407
Penn State		–		–	10	–	15	.400
Buffalo		–		–	10	–	16	.385
Loyola (IL)		–		–	10	–	16	.385
Canisius		–		–	10	–	17	.370
Boston College		–		–	9	–	17	.346
Oklahoma City		–		–	9	–	18	.333
Portland		–		–	9	–	18	.333
Fordham		–		–	7	–	19	.269
Cleveland State		–		–	6	–	19	.240
Houston Baptist		–		–	5	–	21	.192
Baptist		–		–	3	–	23	.115
Samford		–		–	3	–	23	.115
Rankings from AP Poll

The 1975–76 Notre Dame Fighting Irish men's basketball team represented the University of Notre Dame during the 1975–76 season. The team was coached by Digger Phelps and was ranked in the Associated Press poll for the entirety of the season. The Fighting Irish finished the regular season with a record of 23–6. In the 1976 NCAA Division I Basketball Tournament, the Fighting Irish defeated Cincinnati in the first round, 79–78 and then lost to Michigan in the second round.

== Roster ==
1975–76 Notre Dame Fighting Irish men's basketball team
Players
Coaches

Pos.	#	Name	Height	Weight	Year	Hometown
C	54	Roger Anderson	6 ft 10 in (2.08 m)	225 lb (102 kg)	Sr	St. Paul, Minnesota
F/C	45	Dave Batton	6 ft 9 in (2.06 m)	225 lb (102 kg)	So	Springfield, PA
G	10	Jeff Carpenter	6 ft 0 in (1.83 m)	165 lb (75 kg)	So	Oak Park, IL
F	44	Adrian Dantley	6 ft 5 in (1.96 m)	210 lb (95 kg)	Jr	Washington, D. C.
F/C	34	Bruce Flowers	6 ft 8 in (2.03 m)	210 lb (95 kg)	Fr	Huntington Woods, MI
F	22	Randy Haefner	6 ft 6 in (1.98 m)	205 lb (93 kg)	So	Milford, OH
F/C	43	Toby Knight	6 ft 9 in (2.06 m)	210 lb (95 kg)	Jr	Shoreham, NY
G	23	Dave Kuzmicz	6 ft 3 in (1.91 m)	185 lb (84 kg)	Jr	South Bend, IN
C	52	Bill Laimbeer	6 ft 11 in (2.11 m)	225 lb (102 kg)	Fr	Toledo, Ohio
G	21	Ray Martin	6 ft 1 in (1.85 m)	170 lb (77 kg)	Jr	Long Island City, NY
F	55	Bill Paterno	6 ft 6 in (1.98 m)	205 lb (93 kg)	Jr	Spring Lake, NJ
G	25	Don Williams	6 ft 3 in (1.91 m)	180 lb (82 kg)	So	Washington, D.C.

Head coach

- Digger Phelps

Assistant coach(es)

Legend

- (C) Team captain
- (S) Suspended
- (I) Ineligible
- (W) Walk-on
- Injured
- Current redshirt

== Schedule ==
Date time, TV	Rank^{#}	Opponent^{#}	Result	Record	Site city, state
November 29		Kent State	W 90–61	1–0	Joyce Center; Notre Dame, IN
December 2		Valparaiso	W 117–83	2–0	Joyce Center; Notre Dame, IN
December 6		Texas Tech	W 88–63	3–0	Joyce Center; Notre Dame, IN
December 8	No. 9	at Kansas	W 72–64	4–0	Allen Fieldhouse; Lawrence, Kansas
December 11	No. 8	at No. 1 Indiana	L 60–63	4–1	Assembly Hall; Bloomington, Indiana
December 13		Saint Francis (PA)	W 103–73	5–1	Joyce Center; Notre Dame, IN
December 30		at Kentucky	L 77–79	5–2	Freedom Hall; Louisville, Kentucky
January 3	No. 5	at No. 4 UCLA	L 70-86	5–3	Pauley Pavilion; Los Angeles, CA
January 10		Manhattan	W 88–71	6–3	Joyce Center; Notre Dame, IN
January 12		at Pittsburgh	W 77–66	7–3	Fitzgerald Field House; Pittsburgh, Pennsylvania
January 14		Ball State	W 119–78	8–3	Joyce Center; Notre Dame, IN
January 17		at Xavier	W 90–79	9–3	Cincinnati Gardens; Cincinnati, Ohio
January 21		Saint Joseph (IN)	W 97–60	10–3	Joyce Center; Notre Dame, IN
January 24	No. 15	No. 6 UCLA	W 95–85	11–3	Joyce Center; Notre Dame, IN
January 28		DePaul	W 89–68	12–3	Joyce Center; Notre Dame, IN
January 31		Maryland	L 63–69	12–4	Joyce Center; Notre Dame, IN
February 4		at La Salle	W 108–89	13–4	Tom Gola Arena; Philadelphia, Pennsylvania
February 7		Davidson	W 117–74	14–4	Joyce Center; Notre Dame, IN
February 9		St. Bonaventure	W 95–80	15–4	Joyce Center; Notre Dame, IN
February 11		Villanova	W 84–57	16–4	Joyce Center; Notre Dame, IN
February 14		West Virginia	W 97–77	17–4	Joyce Center; Notre Dame, IN
February 16		vs. Butler	W 92–79	18–4	
February 19		vs. Fordham	W 91–78	19–4	
February 21		at South Carolina	W 90–83	20–4	Carolina Coliseum; Columbia, SC
February 25		at Dayton	W 85–79	21–4	University of Dayton Arena; Dayton, Ohio
February 28	No. 6	Marquette	L 75–81	21–5	Joyce Center; Notre Dame, IN
March 1		Western Michigan	W 95–88 ^{OT}	22–5	Joyce Center; Notre Dame, IN
March 13		Cincinnati; NCAA Tournament • First Round	W 79–78	23–5	Allen Fieldhouse; Lawrence, Kansas
March 18		Michigan; NCAA Tournament • Second Round	L 76–80	23–6	Freedom Hall; Louisville, Kentucky
*Non-conference game. ^{#}Rankings from AP Poll. (#) Tournament seedings in parentheses.

== Team players drafted into the NBA ==
Round	Pick	Player	NBA club
1	6	Adrian Dantley	Buffalo Braves
