= 1975–76 Rutgers Scarlet Knights men's basketball team =

American college basketball season

1975–76 Rutgers Scarlet Knights men's basketball

ECAC Metro Tournament champions

NCAA tournament, Final Four
- Conference: Independent

Ranking
- Coaches: No. 3
- AP: No. 4
- Record: 31–2
- Head coach: Tom Young (3rd season)
- Assistant coaches: Joe Boylan; John McFadden; Art Perry
- Home arena: College Avenue Gymnasium

1975–76 NCAA Division I men's basketball independents standings
	Conf.				Overall
Team	W		L	PCT	W		L	PCT
No. 4 Rutgers		–		–	31	–	2	.939
No. 3 UNLV		–		–	29	–	2	.935
No. 2 Marquette		–		–	27	–	2	.931
North Texas State		–		–	22	–	4	.846
No. 19 Centenary		–		–	22	–	5	.815
UNC Charlotte		–		–	24	–	6	.800
Pan American		–		–	20	–	5	.800
No. 7 Notre Dame		–		–	23	–	6	.793
St. John's		–		–	23	–	6	.793
Florida State		–		–	21	–	6	.778
Oral Roberts		–		–	20	–	6	.769
Georgetown		–		–	21	–	7	.750
Virginia Tech		–		–	21	–	7	.750
George Washington		–		–	20	–	7	.741
Illinois State		–		–	20	–	7	.741
Creighton		–		–	19	–	7	.731
Northeast Louisiana		–		–	18	–	7	.720
Detroit		–		–	19	–	8	.704
South Florida		–		–	19	–	8	.704
New Orleans		–		–	18	–	8	.692
No. 17 DePaul		–		–	20	–	9	.690
Syracuse		–		–	20	–	9	.690
Holy Cross		–		–	22	–	10	.688
Seton Hall		–		–	18	–	9	.667
South Alabama		–		–	18	–	9	.667
South Carolina		–		–	18	–	9	.667
Providence		–		–	21	–	11	.656
Stetson		–		–	17	–	9	.654
UC Santa Barbara		–		–	17	–	9	.654
Air Force		–		–	16	–	9	.640
VCU		–		–	16	–	9	.640
St. Peter's		–		–	19	–	11	.633
Portland State		–		–	17	–	10	.630
St. Bonaventure		–		–	17	–	10	.630
Mercer		–		–	15	–	10	.600
Villanova		–		–	16	–	11	.593
Niagara		–		–	17	–	12	.586
Long Island		–		–	15	–	12	.556
Colgate		–		–	13	–	11	.542
Xavier		–		–	14	–	12	.538
West Virginia		–		–	15	–	13	.536
Georgia State		–		–	12	–	11	.522
Indiana State		–		–	13	–	12	.520
Dayton		–		–	14	–	13	.519
Hardin–Simmons		–		–	14	–	13	.519
Jacksonville		–		–	13	–	13	.500
Manhattan		–		–	14	–	14	.500
St. Francis (PA)		–		–	14	–	14	.500
St. Francis (NY)		–		–	13	–	13	.500
Marshall		–		–	13	–	14	.481
Duquesne		–		–	12	–	13	.480
Northeastern		–		–	12	–	13	.480
Fairfield		–		–	12	–	14	.462
Utah State		–		–	12	–	14	.462
Butler		–		–	12	–	15	.444
Denver		–		–	12	–	15	.444
Pittsburgh		–		–	12	–	15	.444
Army		–		–	11	–	14	.440
Iona		–		–	11	–	15	.423
Milwaukee		–		–	11	–	15	.423
Southern Miss		–		–	11	–	15	.423
Navy		–		–	10	–	14	.417
Fairleigh Dickinson		–		–	9	–	13	.409
Georgia Southern		–		–	11	–	16	.407
Hawaii		–		–	11	–	16	.407
Penn State		–		–	10	–	15	.400
Buffalo		–		–	10	–	16	.385
Loyola (IL)		–		–	10	–	16	.385
Canisius		–		–	10	–	17	.370
Boston College		–		–	9	–	17	.346
Oklahoma City		–		–	9	–	18	.333
Portland		–		–	9	–	18	.333
Fordham		–		–	7	–	19	.269
Cleveland State		–		–	6	–	19	.240
Houston Baptist		–		–	5	–	21	.192
Baptist		–		–	3	–	23	.115
Samford		–		–	3	–	23	.115
Rankings from AP Poll

The 1975–76 Rutgers Scarlet Knights men's basketball team represented Rutgers University in the 1975–76 NCAA Division I men's basketball season. The head coach was Tom Young, then in his third season with the Scarlet Knights. The team played its home games in College Avenue Gymnasium in New Brunswick, New Jersey, and was an NCAA Division I Independent. The Scarlet Knights played an exciting, up-tempo brand of basketball, averaging a school-record of 93.3 points per game. They entered the NCAA tournament with a perfect record (28–0), and went on to defeat Princeton, Connecticut, and VMI to reach the only Final Four in school history. After 31 consecutive wins, Rutgers fell to Michigan, 86–70, in the national semifinals, then to UCLA, 106–92, in the consolation game.

Guard Mike Dabney is Maya Moore's father.

== Roster ==
1975–76 Rutgers Scarlet Knights men's basketball team
Players
Coaches

Pos.	#	Name	Height	Weight	Year	Hometown
F	12	Phil Sellers	6 ft 5 in (1.96 m)	200 lb (91 kg)	Sr	Brooklyn, New York
C	20	James Bailey	6 ft 8 in (2.03 m)	195 lb (88 kg)	Fr	Boston, Massachusetts
G	22	Stanford Nance	6 ft 3 in (1.91 m)	170 lb (77 kg)	So	Washington, D.C.
C	24	Bruce Sherer	6 ft 7 in (2.01 m)	200 lb (91 kg)	Sr	Parsippany, New Jersey
G	30	Eddie Jordan	6 ft 1 in (1.85 m)	170 lb (77 kg)	Jr	Washington, D.C.
G	32	Mike Dabney	6 ft 4 in (1.93 m)	180 lb (82 kg)	Sr	East Orange, New Jersey
F	34	Hollis Copeland	6 ft 5 in (1.96 m)	180 lb (82 kg)	So	Trenton, New Jersey
G	42	Mark Conlin	6 ft 2 in (1.88 m)	175 lb (79 kg)	Jr	Queens, New York
G	44	Jeff Kleinbaum	6 ft 2 in (1.88 m)	190 lb (86 kg)	Sr	Queens, New York
G	50	Steve Hefele	6 ft 5 in (1.96 m)	190 lb (86 kg)	So	East Rockaway, New York
C	52	Mike Palko	6 ft 7 in (2.01 m)	200 lb (91 kg)	Sr	Hackettstown, New Jersey
F	54	Abdel Anderson	6 ft 7 in (2.01 m)	185 lb (84 kg)	Fr	Belleville, New Jersey

Head coach

- Tom Young (Maryland)

Assistant coach(es)

- Joe Boylan (Lafayette)
- John McFadden (Rutgers)
- Art Perry (American)

Legend

- (C) Team captain
- (S) Suspended
- (I) Ineligible
- (W) Walk-on
- Injured
- Current redshirt

== Schedule and results ==
Date time, TV	Rank^{#}	Opponent^{#}	Result	Record	Site (attendance) city, state
Regular season
Dec 1, 1975*		Bentley	W 100–60	1–0	College Avenue Gymnasium; New Brunswick, New Jersey
Dec 4, 1975*		vs. Purdue	W 81–73	2–0	
Dec 6, 1975*		Seton Hall	W 119–93	3–0	College Avenue Gymnasium; New Brunswick, New Jersey
Dec 9, 1975*		at Boston College	W 105–82	4–0	Roberts Center; Boston, Massachusetts
Dec 11, 1975*		vs. Pennsylvania	W 95–80	5–0	
Dec 13, 1975*		Connecticut	W 96–83	6–0	College Avenue Gymnasium; New Brunswick, New Jersey
Dec 20, 1975*	No. 15	at Temple	W 95–62	7–0	McGonigle Hall; Philadelphia, Pennsylvania
Dec 29, 1975*	No. 15	vs. The Citadel; Poinsettia Classic	W 96–73	8–0	Greenville Memorial Auditorium; Greenville, South Carolina
Dec 30, 1975*	No. 15	vs. Georgia Tech; Poinsettia Classic	W 94–87	9–0	Greenville Memorial Auditorium; Greenville, South Carolina
Jan 2, 1976*	No. 15	at Stetson	W 91–70	10–0	Edmunds Center; DeLand, Florida
Jan 10, 1976*	No. 12	at Fordham	W 93–55	11–0	Rose Hill Gym; Bronx, New York
Jan 14, 1976*	No. 10	at Columbia	W 94–65	12–0	Levien Gymnasium; New York, New York
Jan 17, 1976*	No. 10	Bucknell	W 105–82	13–0	College Avenue Gymnasium; New Brunswick, New Jersey
Jan 20, 1976*	No. 7	at Lehigh	W 102–87	14–0	Taylor Gym; Bethlehem, Pennsylvania
Jan 24, 1976*	No. 7	at Lafayette	W 113–79	15–0	Kirby Sports Center; Easton, Pennsylvania
Jan 27, 1976*	No. 5	Pittsburgh	W 102–71	16–0	College Avenue Gymnasium; New Brunswick, New Jersey
Feb 2, 1976*	No. 7	at No. 15 Princeton	W 75–62	17–0	Jadwin Gymnasium; Princeton, New Jersey
Feb 5, 1976*	No. 7	vs. West Virginia	W 86–76	18–0	Madison Square Garden; New York, New York
Feb 7, 1976*	No. 7	Navy	W 86–71	19–0	College Avenue Gymnasium; New Brunswick, New Jersey
Feb 9, 1976*	No. 5	Delaware	W 110–87	20–0	College Avenue Gymnasium; New Brunswick, New Jersey
Feb 14, 1976*	No. 5	Manhattan	W 92–81	21–0	College Avenue Gymnasium; New Brunswick, New Jersey
Feb 18, 1976*	No. 4	Syracuse	W 93–80	22–0	College Avenue Gymnasium; New Brunswick, New Jersey
Feb 21, 1976*	No. 4	vs. American	W 94–79	23–0	
Feb 25, 1976*	No. 3	at William & Mary	W 100–90	24–0	Kaplan Arena; Williamsburg, Virginia
Feb 28, 1976*	No. 3	at Long Island	W 103–87	25–0	Schwartz Athletic Center; Brooklyn, New York
Mar 1, 1976*	No. 3	St. Bonaventure	W 85–80	26–0	College Avenue Gymnasium; New Brunswick, New Jersey
ECAC Metro Tournament
Mar 4, 1976*	No. 3	vs. Long Island; Semifinal	W 104–76	27–0	Jadwin Gymnasium; Princeton, New Jersey
Mar 6, 1976*	No. 3	vs. No. 16 St. John's; Championship	W 70–67	28–0	Jadwin Gymnasium; Princeton, New Jersey
NCAA Tournament
Mar 13, 1976*	No. 3	vs. Princeton; East Regional Quarterfinal	W 54–53	29–0	Providence Civic Center; Providence, Rhode Island
Mar 18, 1976*	No. 4	vs. Connecticut; East Regional semifinal – Sweet Sixteen	W 93–79	30–0	Greensboro Coliseum; Greensboro, North Carolina
Mar 20, 1976*	No. 4	vs. VMI; East Regional final – Elite Eight	W 91–75	31–0	Greensboro Coliseum; Greensboro, North Carolina
Mar 27, 1976*	No. 4	vs. No. 9 Michigan; National semifinal – Final Four	L 70–86	31–1	The Spectrum; Philadelphia, Pennsylvania
Mar 29, 1976*	No. 4	vs. No. 5 UCLA; National 3rd-place game	L 92–106	31–2	The Spectrum; Philadelphia, Pennsylvania
*Non-conference game. ^{#}Rankings from AP Poll. (#) Tournament seedings in parentheses. E=East. All times are in Eastern Time.

== Rankings ==
Ranking movements Legend: ██ Increase in ranking ██ Decrease in ranking — = Not ranked ( ) = First-place votes
	Week																
Poll	Pre	1	2	3	4	5	6	7	8	9	10	11	12	13	14	15	Final
AP	—	—	—	15	15	14	12	10	7	5	7	5	4	3	3	3 (1)	4 (2)
Coaches	Not released		17	14	15	16	11	11	8	6	7	5	5	4	4	3	Not released

== Team players drafted into the NBA ==
Round	Pick	Player	NBA club
3	38	Phil Sellers	Detroit Pistons
