= 1975–76 Georgetown Hoyas men's basketball team =

American college basketball season

1975–76 Georgetown Hoyas men's basketball

ECAC South Region tournament champions

NCAA tournament, First Round
- Conference: Independent
- Record: 21–7
- Head coach: John Thompson (4th season)
- Assistant coaches: Bill Stein (4th season); Dwight Datcher (2nd season)
- Captains: Jonathan Smith; Merlin Wilson
- Home arena: McDonough Gymnasium

1975–76 NCAA Division I men's basketball independents standings
	Conf.				Overall
Team	W		L	PCT	W		L	PCT
No. 4 Rutgers		–		–	31	–	2	.939
No. 3 UNLV		–		–	29	–	2	.935
No. 2 Marquette		–		–	27	–	2	.931
North Texas State		–		–	22	–	4	.846
No. 19 Centenary		–		–	22	–	5	.815
UNC Charlotte		–		–	24	–	6	.800
Pan American		–		–	20	–	5	.800
No. 7 Notre Dame		–		–	23	–	6	.793
St. John's		–		–	23	–	6	.793
Florida State		–		–	21	–	6	.778
Oral Roberts		–		–	20	–	6	.769
Georgetown		–		–	21	–	7	.750
Virginia Tech		–		–	21	–	7	.750
George Washington		–		–	20	–	7	.741
Illinois State		–		–	20	–	7	.741
Creighton		–		–	19	–	7	.731
Northeast Louisiana		–		–	18	–	7	.720
Detroit		–		–	19	–	8	.704
South Florida		–		–	19	–	8	.704
New Orleans		–		–	18	–	8	.692
No. 17 DePaul		–		–	20	–	9	.690
Syracuse		–		–	20	–	9	.690
Holy Cross		–		–	22	–	10	.688
Seton Hall		–		–	18	–	9	.667
South Alabama		–		–	18	–	9	.667
South Carolina		–		–	18	–	9	.667
Providence		–		–	21	–	11	.656
Stetson		–		–	17	–	9	.654
UC Santa Barbara		–		–	17	–	9	.654
Air Force		–		–	16	–	9	.640
VCU		–		–	16	–	9	.640
St. Peter's		–		–	19	–	11	.633
Portland State		–		–	17	–	10	.630
St. Bonaventure		–		–	17	–	10	.630
Mercer		–		–	15	–	10	.600
Villanova		–		–	16	–	11	.593
Niagara		–		–	17	–	12	.586
Long Island		–		–	15	–	12	.556
Colgate		–		–	13	–	11	.542
Xavier		–		–	14	–	12	.538
West Virginia		–		–	15	–	13	.536
Georgia State		–		–	12	–	11	.522
Indiana State		–		–	13	–	12	.520
Dayton		–		–	14	–	13	.519
Hardin–Simmons		–		–	14	–	13	.519
Jacksonville		–		–	13	–	13	.500
Manhattan		–		–	14	–	14	.500
St. Francis (PA)		–		–	14	–	14	.500
St. Francis (NY)		–		–	13	–	13	.500
Marshall		–		–	13	–	14	.481
Duquesne		–		–	12	–	13	.480
Northeastern		–		–	12	–	13	.480
Fairfield		–		–	12	–	14	.462
Utah State		–		–	12	–	14	.462
Butler		–		–	12	–	15	.444
Denver		–		–	12	–	15	.444
Pittsburgh		–		–	12	–	15	.444
Army		–		–	11	–	14	.440
Iona		–		–	11	–	15	.423
Milwaukee		–		–	11	–	15	.423
Southern Miss		–		–	11	–	15	.423
Navy		–		–	10	–	14	.417
Fairleigh Dickinson		–		–	9	–	13	.409
Georgia Southern		–		–	11	–	16	.407
Hawaii		–		–	11	–	16	.407
Penn State		–		–	10	–	15	.400
Buffalo		–		–	10	–	16	.385
Loyola (IL)		–		–	10	–	16	.385
Canisius		–		–	10	–	17	.370
Boston College		–		–	9	–	17	.346
Oklahoma City		–		–	9	–	18	.333
Portland		–		–	9	–	18	.333
Fordham		–		–	7	–	19	.269
Cleveland State		–		–	6	–	19	.240
Houston Baptist		–		–	5	–	21	.192
Baptist		–		–	3	–	23	.115
Samford		–		–	3	–	23	.115
Rankings from AP Poll

The 1975–76 Georgetown Hoyas men's basketball team represented Georgetown University during the 1975–76 NCAA Division I college basketball season. John Thompson, coached them in his fourth season as head coach. An independent, Georgetown played its home games at McDonough Gymnasium on the Georgetown campus in Washington, D.C., and finished the season with a record of 21–7. The team won the 1976 ECAC South Region tournament and appeared in the 1976 NCAA tournament for the second consecutive year, losing in the first round to Arizona.

== Season recap ==
Sophomore center Ed Hopkins had required surgery for a serious leg injury during the summer of 1975, and his recovery hampered him this season, although he appeared in 26 of Georgetown's 28 games. With Hopkins limited, and despite suffering from back problems, senior center and team co-captain Merlin Wilson started all 28 games, shot 57 percent from the field, and averaged 11.1 points and 9.8 rebounds per game. He had a 22-point, 20-rebound performance against Upsala in the season opener, the last of eight 20-rebound games during his collegiate career, by far a school record no one has come close to since.

Although he averaged only 13 shots per game, sophomore guard Derrick Jackson became the team's leading scorer this season, the first of three seasons he achieved this. He averaged 17 points per game and scored a career-high 28 points against Penn State. Over the season as a whole, he shot 195-for-399 (48.9%) from the field and scored 406 points; he would post almost identical statistics the following season.

Freshman forward Al Dutch started all 28 games and had a strong season, scoring 20 or more points in six games. He scored 27 points in Georgetown's overtime upset of No. 12-ranked St. John's and 28 points against Navy. Freshman guard Steve Martin gave a glimpse of his future potential when he shot 6-for-6 from the field and scored 14 points in a game against Southern Connecticut State. Senior forward Bill Lynn, meanwhile, scored 22 points against Southern Connecticut State and shot 53 percent from the field for the season, specializing in outside jump shots. Junior forward Larry Long missed the first 11 games of the season because of academic issues, but returned to the team to shoot 42% from the field and average 7.4 points per game for the year.

Although retaining its status as an independent, Georgetown was in its second season as a member of the Eastern College Athletic Conference (ECAC), a loosely organized sports federation that held four regional post-season Division I basketball tournaments in 1976 for independent Eastern colleges and universities similar to the end-of-season conference tournaments held by conventional college basketball conferences, with each tournament winner receiving an at-large bid to the 1976 NCAA Division I men's basketball tournament. For the second straight year, the Hoyas competed in the ECAC South Region tournament, which they had won the previous year. Derrick Jackson scored 22 points as Georgetown defeated Villanova in the semifinal.

In the final on March 6, 1976, the Hoyas faced George Washington, which was on the brink of reaching the NCAA Tournament for the first time since 1961. George Washington had defeated Georgetown in eight of the last 11 meetings between the schools, including a regular-season game only nine days earlier. Georgetown's starters scored only 21 points, but the Hoyas' bench scored 44 and the Hoyas won 68–63 to take the ECAC South Region championship for the second consecutive season and secure a second-straight NCAA Tournament bid. The Colonials did not come as close to an NCAA Tournament appearance again until they received a bid to the 1993 tournament. Georgetown senior guard and team co-captain Jonathan Smith, a former team scoring leader whose numbers had declined this season and who had averaged only 5.6 points per game during the regular season, scored 20 points against Villanova and 16 against George Washington during the ECAC South Region Tournament.

Playing in the NCAA Tournament's West Region, Georgetown lost in the first round to 15th-ranked Arizona. Derrick Jackson again scored 22 points during the game, while Jonathan Smith scored 20.

The team was not ranked in the Top 20 in the Associated Press Poll or Coaches' Poll at any time.

== Roster ==
Sophomore guard Craig Esherick would later serve as an assistant coach for the Hoyas from 1982 to 1999 and as head coach from 1999 to 2004. Sophomore guard Mike Riley would later serve as a Hoya assistant coach from 1982 to 2004.

#	Name	Height	Weight (lbs.)	Position	Class	Hometown	Previous team(s)
10	Craig Esherick	6'3"	N/A	G	So.	Silver Spring, MD, U.S.	Springbrook HS
12	Mike Riley	5'8"	N/A	G	So.	Washington, DC, U.S.	United States Navy
14	Bill Lynn	6'9"	185	F	Sr.	Washington, DC, U.S.	Spingarn HS
20	Steve Martin	6'4"	175	F	Fr.	New Orleans, LA, U.S.	St. Augustine HS
22	Derrick Jackson	6'0"	180	G	So.	Wheaton, IL, U.S.	Wheaton Central HS
24	Bill Thomas	6'4"	N/A	F	Sr.	Dallas, TX, U.S.	Lake Highlands HS; Northampton Community College (Pa.)
25	Al Dutch	6'7"	190	F	Fr.	Washington, DC, U.S.	Archbishop Carroll HS
30	Jonathan Smith	6'1"	185	G	Sr.	Washington, DC, U.S.	St. Anthony's HS
32	Larry Long	6'7"	200	F	Jr.	Washington, DC, U.S.	Mackin HS
33	Gary Wilson	6'7"	N/A	C	Fr.	Washington, DC, U.S.	St. Anthony's HS
34	Mike MacDermott	6'4"	N/A	G	Jr.	Saratoga Springs, NY, U.S.	St. Peter HS
40	Greg Brooks	6'6"	N/A	G	Sr.	Washington, DC, U.S.	St. Anthony's HS
42	Felix Yeoman	6'7"	N/A	F/C	So.	Washington, DC, U.S.	St. Anthony's HS
44	Merlin Wilson	6'9"	215	C	Sr.	Washington, DC, U.S.	St. Anthony's HS
50	Mark Gallagher	6'5"	N/A	F	Sr.	Lynbrook, NY, U.S.	Archbishop Molloy HS
52	Ed Hopkins	6'9"	225	C	So.	Baltimore, MD, U.S.	Edmondson-Westside HS
55	Tom Scates	6'11"	N/A	C	Fr.	Alexandria, VA, U.S.	St. Anthony's HS, (Washington, DC)

== 1975–76 schedule and results ==
Sources

- All times are Eastern

Date time, TV	Rank^{#}	Opponent^{#}	Result	Record	Site city, state
Regular season
Sat., Nov. 29, 1975 no, no		Upsala	W 69–50	1-0	McDonough Gymnasium; Washington, DC
Wed., Dec. 3, 1975 no, no		Saint Leo	W 94–72	2-0	McDonough Gymnasium; Washington, DC
Sat., Dec. 6, 1975 no, no		at St. Bonaventure	L 59–63 ^{OT}	2-1	Reilly Center; Olean, NY
Tue., Dec. 9, 1975 no, no		Maryland Eastern Shore	W 97–67	3-1	McDonough Gymnasium; Washington, DC
Sat., Dec. 20, 1975 no, no		Rider	W 83–68	4-1	McDonough Gymnasium; Washington, DC
Tue., Dec. 23, 1975 no, no		Southern Connecticut State	W 94–57	5-1	McDonough Gymnasium; Washington, DC
Sun., Dec. 28, 1975 no, no		vs. Colgate; Porreco Cup	W 51–49	6-1	Gannon Auditorium; Erie, PA
Mon., Dec. 29, 1975 no, no		at Gannon; Porreco Cup	L 56–57	6-2	Gannon Auditorium; Erie, PA
Sat., Jan. 3, 1976 no, no		Stonehill	W 117–84	7-2	McDonough Gymnasium; Washington, DC
Wed., Jan. 7, 1976 no, no		at St. Joseph's	W 72–61	8-2	Palestra; Philadelphia, PA
Sat., Jan. 10, 1976 no, no		Fairfield	W 81–50	9-2	McDonough Gymnasium; Washington, DC
Wed., Jan. 14, 1976 no, no		Navy	W 73–65	10-2	McDonough Gymnasium; Washington, DC
Sat., Jan. 17, 1976 no, no		Dickinson	W 93–75	11-2	McDonough Gymnasium; Washington, DC
Wed., Jan. 21, 1976 no, no		American	W 78–69	12-2	McDonough Gymnasium; Washington, DC
Sat., Jan. 24, 1976 no, no		at Seton Hall	L 91–102	12-3	Walsh Gymnasium; South Orange, NJ
Tue., Jan. 27, 1976 no, no		Penn State	W 71–63	13-3	McDonough Gymnasium; Washington, DC
Sat., Jan. 31, 1976 no, no		Holy Cross	W 95–74	14-3	McDonough Gymnasium; Washington, DC
Wed., Feb. 4, 1976 no, no		No. 12 St. John's	W 74–73 ^{OT}	15-3	McDonough Gymnasium; Washington, DC
Wed., Feb. 11, 1976 no, no		Fairleigh Dickinson	W 60–52	16-3	McDonough Gymnasium; Washington, DC
Sat., Feb. 14, 1976 no, no		St. Peter's	L 61–63	16-4	McDonough Gymnasium; Washington, DC
Wed., Feb. 18, 1976 no, no		vs. No. 7 Maryland	L 63–72	16-5	Capital Centre; Landover, MD
Sat., Feb. 21, 1976 no, no		at Boston College	W 70–64	17-5	Roberts Center; Chestnut Hill, MA
Wed., Feb. 25, 1976 no, no		George Washington	L 79–81 ^{OT}	17-6	McDonough Gymnasium; Washington, DC
Sat., Feb. 28, 1976 no, no		at Fordham	W 73–66	18-6	Rose Hill Gymnasium; Bronx, NY
Tue., Mar. 2, 1976 no, no		at Iona	W 76–68	19-6	John A. Mulcahy Campus Events Center; New Rochelle, NY
ECAC South Region tournament
Fri., Mar. 5, 1976 no, no		vs. Villanova; Semifinal	W 72–59	20-6	WVU Coliseum; Morgantown, WV
Sat., Mar. 6, 1976 no, no		vs. George Washington; Final	W 68–63	21-6	WVU Coliseum; Morgantown, WV
NCAA tournament
Sat., Mar. 13, 1976 no, no		vs. No. 15 Arizona; West Region First Round	L 76–83	21-7	Arizona State University Activity Center; Tempe, AZ
*Non-conference game. ^{#}Rankings from AP Poll. (#) Tournament seedings in parentheses.
