= 1975–76 Centenary Gentlemen basketball team =

American college basketball season

1975–76 Centenary Gentlemen men's basketball
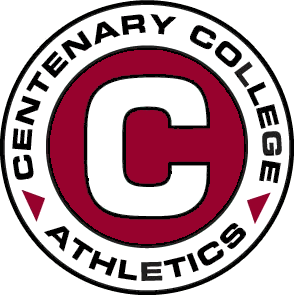
- Conference: Independent

Ranking
- AP: No. 19
- Record: 22–5
- Head coach: Larry Little (5th season)
- Home arena: Gold Dome

1975–76 NCAA Division I men's basketball independents standings
	Conf.				Overall
Team	W		L	PCT	W		L	PCT
No. 4 Rutgers		–		–	31	–	2	.939
No. 3 UNLV		–		–	29	–	2	.935
No. 2 Marquette		–		–	27	–	2	.931
North Texas State		–		–	22	–	4	.846
No. 19 Centenary		–		–	22	–	5	.815
UNC Charlotte		–		–	24	–	6	.800
Pan American		–		–	20	–	5	.800
No. 7 Notre Dame		–		–	23	–	6	.793
St. John's		–		–	23	–	6	.793
Florida State		–		–	21	–	6	.778
Oral Roberts		–		–	20	–	6	.769
Georgetown		–		–	21	–	7	.750
Virginia Tech		–		–	21	–	7	.750
George Washington		–		–	20	–	7	.741
Illinois State		–		–	20	–	7	.741
Creighton		–		–	19	–	7	.731
Northeast Louisiana		–		–	18	–	7	.720
Detroit		–		–	19	–	8	.704
South Florida		–		–	19	–	8	.704
New Orleans		–		–	18	–	8	.692
No. 17 DePaul		–		–	20	–	9	.690
Syracuse		–		–	20	–	9	.690
Holy Cross		–		–	22	–	10	.688
Seton Hall		–		–	18	–	9	.667
South Alabama		–		–	18	–	9	.667
South Carolina		–		–	18	–	9	.667
Providence		–		–	21	–	11	.656
Stetson		–		–	17	–	9	.654
UC Santa Barbara		–		–	17	–	9	.654
Air Force		–		–	16	–	9	.640
VCU		–		–	16	–	9	.640
St. Peter's		–		–	19	–	11	.633
Portland State		–		–	17	–	10	.630
St. Bonaventure		–		–	17	–	10	.630
Mercer		–		–	15	–	10	.600
Villanova		–		–	16	–	11	.593
Niagara		–		–	17	–	12	.586
Long Island		–		–	15	–	12	.556
Colgate		–		–	13	–	11	.542
Xavier		–		–	14	–	12	.538
West Virginia		–		–	15	–	13	.536
Georgia State		–		–	12	–	11	.522
Indiana State		–		–	13	–	12	.520
Dayton		–		–	14	–	13	.519
Hardin–Simmons		–		–	14	–	13	.519
Jacksonville		–		–	13	–	13	.500
Manhattan		–		–	14	–	14	.500
St. Francis (PA)		–		–	14	–	14	.500
St. Francis (NY)		–		–	13	–	13	.500
Marshall		–		–	13	–	14	.481
Duquesne		–		–	12	–	13	.480
Northeastern		–		–	12	–	13	.480
Fairfield		–		–	12	–	14	.462
Utah State		–		–	12	–	14	.462
Butler		–		–	12	–	15	.444
Denver		–		–	12	–	15	.444
Pittsburgh		–		–	12	–	15	.444
Army		–		–	11	–	14	.440
Iona		–		–	11	–	15	.423
Milwaukee		–		–	11	–	15	.423
Southern Miss		–		–	11	–	15	.423
Navy		–		–	10	–	14	.417
Fairleigh Dickinson		–		–	9	–	13	.409
Georgia Southern		–		–	11	–	16	.407
Hawaii		–		–	11	–	16	.407
Penn State		–		–	10	–	15	.400
Buffalo		–		–	10	–	16	.385
Loyola (IL)		–		–	10	–	16	.385
Canisius		–		–	10	–	17	.370
Boston College		–		–	9	–	17	.346
Oklahoma City		–		–	9	–	18	.333
Portland		–		–	9	–	18	.333
Fordham		–		–	7	–	19	.269
Cleveland State		–		–	6	–	19	.240
Houston Baptist		–		–	5	–	21	.192
Baptist		–		–	3	–	23	.115
Samford		–		–	3	–	23	.115
Rankings from AP Poll

The 1975–76 Centenary Gents basketball team represented Centenary College of Louisiana as an NCAA Division I Independent during the 1975–76 college basketball season. The team was coached by Larry Little and played their home games at Gold Dome in Shreveport, Louisiana. Led by senior center Robert Parish, future Naismith Memorial Basketball Hall of Fame and College Basketball Hall of Fame inductee, the Gents were ranked in the Associated Press poll a total of 11 (of 17) weeks that season. Centenary finished with an overall record of 22–5 and a No. 19 ranking in the final AP poll.

== Roster ==
1975–76 Centenary Gentlemen men's basketball team
Players
Coaches

Pos.	#	Name	Height	Weight	Year	Previous school	Hometown
C	00	Robert Parish	7 ft 0 in (2.13 m)	220 lb (100 kg)	Sr	Woodlawn HS	Shreveport, Louisiana
		Nate Bland	—	—	Sr
		Barry McLeod	—	—	Sr
		John Pitts	—	—	Jr
		Bobby White	—	—	So

Head coach

- Larry Little

Assistant coach(es)

Legend

- (C) Team captain
- (S) Suspended
- (I) Ineligible
- (W) Walk-on
- Injured
- Current redshirt

== Schedule and results ==
Date time, TV	Rank^{#}	Opponent^{#}	Result	Record	High points	High rebounds	High assists	Site city, state
Regular Season
Nov 29, 1975*		at South Alabama	W 82–68	1–0	23 – Bland	19 – Parish	–	Jaguar Gym; Mobile, Alabama
Dec 4, 1975*		NW Louisiana State	W 82–67	2–0	31 – Parish	21 – Parish	–	Gold Dome; Shreveport, Louisiana
Dec 6, 1975*		at McNeese State	W 87–70	3–0	25 – Bland	23 – Parish	–	Lake Charles Civic Center; Lake Charles, Louisiana
Dec 9, 1975*		at Southwestern Louisiana	W 97–80	4–0	21 – Pitts	14 – Parish	–	Blackham Coliseum; Lafayette, Louisiana
Dec 11, 1975*		South Alabama	L 72–74	4–1	18 – Bland	14 – Pitts	–	Gold Dome; Shreveport, Louisiana
Dec 13, 1975*		Texas	W 87–79	5–1	29 – Parish	19 – Parish	–	Gold Dome; Shreveport, Louisiana
Dec 16, 1975*		Virginia Commonwealth	W 94–69	6–1	28 – Parish	19 – Parish	–	Gold Dome; Shreveport, Louisiana
Dec 20, 1975*		at Northern Illinois	W 99–84	7–1	24 – Parish	24 – Parish	–	Chick Evans Field House; DeKalb, Illinois
Dec 23, 1975*	No. 19 т	at Illinois State	W 76–72	8–1	25 – Bland	15 – Parish	–	Horton Field House; Normal, Illinois
Dec 28, 1975*	No. 19 т	vs. Bowling Green; All-College Tournament	W 82–69	9–1	20 – Bland	14 – Parish	–	Frederickson Fieldhouse; Oklahoma City, Oklahoma
Dec 29, 1975*	No. 18	vs. Utah State; All-College Tournament	W 89–73	10–1	24 – Parish	14 – Parish	–	Frederickson Fieldhouse; Oklahoma City, Oklahoma
Dec 30, 1975*	No. 18	vs. Long Island University; All-College Tournament	L 78–80	10–2	28 – Parish	21 – Parish	–	Frederickson Fieldhouse; Oklahoma City, Oklahoma
Jan 3, 1976*	No. 18	at Texas	W 75–70	11–2	32 – Parish	14 – Parish	–	Gregory Gym; Austin, Texas
Jan 5, 1976*		UNC Charlotte	W 73–71	12–2	27 – Bland	19 – Parish	–	Gold Dome; Shreveport, Louisiana
Jan 6, 1976*		Hawaii	W 89–82	13–2	27 – Tied	19 – Parish	–	Gold Dome; Shreveport, Louisiana
Jan 10, 1976*		Louisiana Tech	W 101–78	14–2	29 – Parish	23 – Parish	–	Gold Dome; Shreveport, Louisiana
Jan 15, 1976*	No. 18	at Northeast Louisiana	L 57–59	14–3	22 – Parish	27 – Parish	–	Fant-Ewing Coliseum; Monroe, Louisiana
Jan 19, 1976*	No. 18	at NW Louisiana State	W 84–82	15–3	21 – Parish	14 – Parish	–	Prather Coliseum; Natchitoches, Louisiana
Jan 27, 1976*		at East Texas Baptist	W 89–75	16–3	33 – Parish	23 – Parish	–	Gold Dome; Shreveport, Louisiana
Jan 31, 1976*	No. 19	at Houston Baptist	W 123–90	17–3	32 – Parish	9 – Pitts	–	Sharp Gymnasium; Houston, Texas
Feb 5, 1976*	No. 18	Hardin-Simmons	W 133–94	18–3	25 – Parish	19 – Parish	–	Gold Dome; Shreveport, Louisiana
Feb 7, 1976*	No. 18	Southern Mississippi	W 87–67	19–3	26 – Parish	20 – Parish	–	Gold Dome; Shreveport, Louisiana
Feb 14, 1976*	No. 19	at No. 7 Nevada-Las Vegas	L 92–121	19–4	22 – Parish	11 – Parish	–	Las Vegas Convention Center (6,257); Las Vegas, Nevada
Feb 17, 1976*	No. 20	at Hardin-Simmons	W 95–84	20–4	29 – Bland	22 – Parish	–	Taylor County Expo Center (1,300); Abilene, Texas
Feb 21, 1976*	No. 20	Houston Baptist	W 110–95	21–4	36 – Parish	17 – Parish	–	Gold Dome (3,500); Shreveport, Louisiana
Feb 28, 1976*	No. 19	at UNC Charlotte	L 78–79	21–5	30 – Parish	17 – Parish	–	Belk Gymnasium (11,666); Charlotte, North Carolina
Mar 1, 1976*	No. 19	at Virginia Commonwealth	W 98–94	22–5	28 – Parish	20 – Parish	–	Franklin Street Gym (3,202); Richmond, Virginia
*Non-conference game. ^{#}Rankings from AP Poll. (#) Tournament seedings in parentheses.

== Awards and honors ==
- Robert Parish – Second-Team All-American (AP)

== 1976 NBA draft ==
Round	Pick	Player	NBA Club
1	8	Robert Parish	Golden State Warriors
