= 1975–76 Princeton Tigers men's basketball team =

American college basketball season

1975–76 Princeton Tigers men's basketball

Undefeated Ivy League Champion

1976 NCAA Division I men's basketball tournament, Regional quarterfinals
- Conference: Ivy League

Ranking
- Coaches: No. 19t
- Record: 22–5 (14–0, 1st Ivy)
- Head coach: Pete Carril
- Captains: Armond Hill; Michael Steuerer
- Home arena: Jadwin Gymnasium

1975–76 Ivy League men's basketball standings
	Conf.				Overall
Team	W		L	PCT	W		L	PCT
Princeton	14	–	0	1.000	22	–	5	.815
Penn	11	–	3	.786	17	–	9	.654
Dartmouth	7	–	7	.500	16	–	10	.615
Columbia	6	–	8	.429	8	–	17	.320
Brown	6	–	8	.429	7	–	19	.269
Yale	5	–	9	.357	7	–	21	.250
Cornell	4	–	10	.286	8	–	18	.308
Harvard	3	–	11	.214	8	–	18	.308
Rankings from AP Poll

The 1975–76 Princeton Tigers men's basketball team represented Princeton University in intercollegiate college basketball during the 1975–76 NCAA Division I men's basketball season. The head coach was Pete Carril and the team co-captains were Armond Hill and Michael Steuerer. The team played its home games in the Jadwin Gymnasium on the university campus in Princeton, New Jersey. It was the undefeated Ivy League and earned birth in the 32-team 1976 NCAA Division I men's basketball tournament.

The team posted a 22–5 overall record and a 14–0 conference record. No Ivy League team would go 14–0 again until the 1990–91 Princeton Tigers men's basketball team. The team lost its March 13, 1976 NCAA Division I men's basketball tournament East Regional first-round game against the No. 3 Rutgers Scarlett Knights 54–53 at the Providence Civic Center in Providence, Rhode Island.

During the season, the team spent two weeks of the seventeen-week season ranked in the Associated Press Top Twenty Poll, peaking at number fifteen and ending the season unranked. However, the team finished the season ranked tied at number nineteen in the final UPI Coaches' Poll. The team was the first of nineteen Princeton teams to win the national statistical championship in scoring defense with an average of 52.9 points allowed. That was an NCAA record (since 1965) that the team would break the following season. Ilan Ramati posted seven blocked shots against William & Mary on January 6, 1976, which established an Ivy League record that would stand until Chris Dudley had nine on February 14, 1987. It remains a league record for non-conference games. In the same game, Frank Sowinski made all twelve of his free throws to find his way into the Ivy League's record books although short of Bill Bradley's perfect 16 free throw night and the Ivy League record of 21. Michael Steurer had eight steals against Columbia on February 6, 1976, which established an Ivy League record that would stand until March 5, 1983.

The team was led by first team All-Ivy League selection Armond Hill, who was named Ivy League Men's Basketball Player of the Year, and by fellow first team selection Barnes Hauptfuhrer. Hill was selected in the 1976 NBA draft with the 9th overall selection in the first round by the Atlanta Hawks, while Hauptfuhrer was selected with the 43rd overall selection in the third round by the Houston Rockets. Hill repeated as the free throw percentage statistical champion with an 84.8% average. He also surpassed Tim van Blommesteyn's Ivy League single-season steals record set the prior season by one with 73, establishing a record that would last twenty-four years.

== Schedule and results ==
The team posted a 22–5 (14–0 Ivy League) record.

Date time, TV	Rank^{#}	Opponent^{#}	Result	Record	Site city, state
Regular season
Nov 29, 1975*		Drexel	W 67–48	1–0	Jadwin Gymnasium; Princeton, New Jersey
Dec 3, 1975*		at Navy	W 60–59	2–0	Dahlgren Hall; Annapolis, Maryland
Dec 6, 1975*		Lafayette	W 84–65	3–0	Jadwin Gymnasium; Princeton, New Jersey
Dec 9, 1975*		Villanova	L 49–51	3–1	Jadwin Gymnasium; Princeton, New Jersey
Dec 19, 1975*		vs. Miami (OH); Michigan Invitational	L 61–66	3–2	Crisler Arena; Ann Arbor, Michigan
Dec 20, 1975*		vs. Southern Illinois; Michigan Invitational	W 69–58	4–2	Crisler Arena; Ann Arbor, Michigan
Dec 29, 1975*		vs. No. 8 Alabama; Maryland Invitational	W 61–59	5–2	Cole Fieldhouse; College Park, Maryland
Dec 30, 1975*		at No. 2 Maryland; Maryland Invitational	L 59–66	5–3	Cole Fieldhouse; College Park, Maryland
Jan 3, 1976		Penn	W 63–39	6–3 (1–0)	Jadwin Gymnasium; Princeton, New Jersey
Jan 6, 1976*		William & Mary	W 64–63	7–3	Jadwin Gymnasium; Princeton, New Jersey
Jan 9, 1976		at Harvard	W 62–57	8–3 (2–0)	Lavietes Pavilion; Cambridge, Massachusetts
Jan 10, 1976		at Dartmouth	W 59–38	9–3 (3–0)	Alumni Gym; Hanover, New Hampshire
Jan 13, 1976*		at Saint Joseph's	W 56–46	10–3	Alumni Memorial Fieldhouse; Philadelphia, Pennsylvania
Jan 24, 1976*		No. 9 St. John's	W 58–55 ^{OT}	11–3	Jadwin Gymnasium; Princeton, New Jersey
Jan 27, 1976	No. 17	at Penn	W 69–52	12–3 (4–0)	The Palestra; Philadelphia, Pennsylvania
Feb 2, 1976*	No. 15	No. 7 Rutgers	L 62–75	12–4	Jadwin Gymnasium; Princeton, New Jersey
Feb 6, 1976*	No. 15	Columbia	W 69–53	13–4 (5–0)	Jadwin Gymnasium; Princeton, New Jersey
Feb 7, 1976*	No. 15	Cornell	W 53–35	14–4 (6–0)	Jadwin Gymnasium; Princeton, New Jersey
Feb 13, 1976		at Brown	W 56–47	15–4 (7–0)	Marvel Gymnasium; Providence, Rhode Island
Feb 14, 1976		at Yale	W 49–48	16–4 (8–0)	John J. Lee Amphitheater; New Haven, Connecticut
Feb 20, 1976		Dartmouth	W 74–51	17–4 (9–0)	Jadwin Gymnasium; Princeton, New Jersey
Feb 21, 1976		Harvard	W 69–48	18–4 (10–0)	Jadwin Gymnasium; Princeton, New Jersey
Feb 27, 1976*		Yale	W 68–53	19–4 (11–0)	Jadwin Gymnasium; Princeton, New Jersey
Feb 28, 1976		Brown	W 70–59	20–4 (12–0)	Jadwin Gymnasium; Princeton, New Jersey
Mar 5, 1976		at Cornell	W 72–58	21–4 (13–0)	Barton Hall; Ithaca, New York
Mar 6, 1976		at Columbia	W 46–44	22–4 (14–0)	Levien Gymnasium; New York, New York
NCAA tournament
Mar 13, 1976*		vs. No. 3 Rutgers; First round	L 53–54	22–5	Providence Civic Center; Providence, Rhode Island
*Non-conference game. ^{#}Rankings from AP Poll. (#) Tournament seedings in parentheses. E=East.

== Rankings ==
Ranking movement Legend: ██ Increase in ranking. ██ Decrease in ranking.
Poll	Pre	Wk 1	Wk 2	Wk 3	Wk 4	Wk 5	Wk 6	Wk 7	Wk 8	Wk 9	Wk 10	Wk 11	Wk 12	Wk 13	Wk 14	Wk 15	Wk 16	Final
AP Top 20 Poll	-	-	-	-	-	-	-	-	-	-	19	17	-	-	-	-	-	-

== NCAA tournament ==
The team won the 1976 NCAA Division I men's basketball tournament.

3/13/76 in Providence, R.I.: Rutgers 54, Princeton 53

== Awards and honors ==
- Armond Hill
  - Ivy League Men's Basketball Player of the Year
  - First Team All-Ivy League
  - All-East
- Barnes Hauptfuhrer
  - First Team All-Ivy League
- Bob Slaughter
  - Second Team All-Ivy League

== Team players drafted into the NBA ==
Three players from this team were selected in the NBA draft.

Year	Round	Pick	Player	NBA Club
1976	1	9	Armond Hill	Atlanta Hawks
1976	3	10	Barnes Hauptfuhrer	Houston Rockets
1978	9	1	Frank Sowinski	New Jersey Nets
