= Art Perry =

Former NCAA Division I Basketball coach

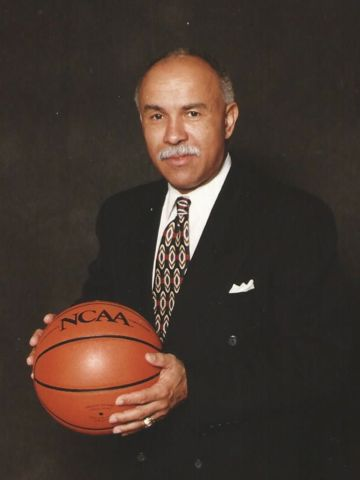
- Perry in 1997

Biographical details
- Born: November 8, 1946 (age 79); Washington, D.C., U.S.

Playing career
- 1970–1973: American
- Position: Guard

Coaching career (HC unless noted)
- 1973–1976: Rutgers (part-time assistant)
- 1976–1978: Connecticut (assistant)
- 1978–1985: Rutgers (assistant)
- 1985–1990: Old Dominion (assistant)
- 1990–1996: Maryland (assistant)
- 1996–1997: Delaware State
- 1997–2000: American

Head coaching record
- Overall: 34–78

Arthur Aaron Perry (born 1946) is an American former collegiate basketball coach, active from 1973 to 2000. He held head coaching positions at American University and Delaware State University, in addition to five assistant coaching positions at the collegiate level. He amassed a career record as head coach in NCAA Division I basketball programs of 34 wins and 78 losses. Through his coaching career, Perry was noted for being an effective recruiter of players, and he emphasized mentorship of young athletes.

== Early life and playing career ==
Perry was born in Washington, DC, to his parents Thelma Garrett Perry (a public school teacher) and Aaron Perry (a professional boxer). He attended DC public schools, graduating from Eastern High School, playing sports all through school. Perry enrolled at Howard University but was drafted for the military, and so he instead enlisted in the United States Air Force for which he served as a crew chief.

After his military service, Perry played collegiate basketball for American University from 1970 to 1973 as point guard and shooting guard, until an injury ended his career as a player. In the 1971–2 season, he scored in double figures in 16 of the 19 games that Perry played in, and his team participated in the National Invitational Tournament. Following his injury, Perry transferred to Rutgers University, where he earned a Bachelor of Arts degree with a major in Health, Physical Education and Recreation, graduating in 1975.

== Coaching career ==
Perry began his coaching career in 1973 as a part-time assistant coach for the men's basketball team at Rutgers University. During his tenure at Rutgers, the team finished the 1975–76 season undefeated and earned a berth in the NCAA Final Four.

Perry's first position as a head coach in NCAA Division I Men's College Basketball was at Delaware State University in 1996. He inherited a team in disarray, with little discipline, while having a difficult schedule with more than 8 NCAA playoff teams as opponents. His team improved under Perry's guidance. However, following the 1996–7 season, Perry took over as head coach of the men's basketball team at American University, a return to his former college team. As coach at American University, Perry favored a style of play that takes advantage of speed and defense.

In a player development effort, Perry took his team at American University on a 12-day tour of Italy, playing various European basketball teams, giving players opportunities they may not have had otherwise.

Perry's collegiate coaching career ended in 2000 following his tenure at American University.

== Head coaching record ==
Record table
Season	Team	Overall	Conference	Standing	Postseason
Delaware State Hornets (Mid-Eastern Athletic Conference) (1996–1997)
1996–97	Delaware State	7–20	7–11	T–7th	
Delaware State:		7–20 (.259)			
American Eagles (Colonial Athletic Association) (1997–2000)
1997–98	American	9–19	5–11	7th	
1998–99	American	7–21	2–14	9th	
1999–2000	American	11–18	5–11	8th	
American:		27–58 (.318)			
Total:		34–78 (.304)			

== Personal life and post-coaching career ==
Perry married Janis Perry (née Freeman) who is the daughter of Grammy Award-winning musician and bandleader Ernie Freeman.

Since the end of his coaching career, Perry has served as director of Hoops Consulting, which advises schools, coaches, players, and parents on matters relating to athletics and academics. He also consulted for two years for the Washington Wizards of the National Basketball Association.

Perry is currently retired and resides in Lewes, Delaware with his wife Janis, where he has at times been active in helping local political candidates. He has been involved in a variety of volunteer activities and is an avid tennis player.

== Awards and recognition ==
Perry accepted the 1995 Naismith Award on behalf of Joe Smith who was one of his players at the University of Maryland.

In 1999, Perry, with the rest of the players and coaches of the 1976 Men's Basketball Team, was inducted into the Rutgers University Athletic Hall of Fame.

As of 2019, Perry was a 45-year member of the National Association of Basketball Coaches.

During his post-coaching career, Perry worked for Nike Co. in their local outlet store, where he twice was named outstanding employee among the 163 outlet stores that Nike was operating as of 2019.
