= 1975–76 Western Michigan Broncos men's basketball team =

American college basketball season

1975–76 Western Michigan Broncos men's basketball

Mid-American Conference Champions

NCAA tournament, Sweet Sixteen
- Conference: Mid-American Conference

Ranking
- Coaches: No. 19
- AP: No. 10
- Record: 25–3 (15–1 MAC)
- Head coach: Eldon Miller
- Assistant coaches: Dick Shilts; Rich Walker
- Home arena: University Arena

1975–76 Mid-American Conference men's basketball standings
	Conf.				Overall
Team	W		L	PCT	W		L	PCT
No. 10 Western Michigan	15	–	1	.938	25	–	3	.893
Miami (Ohio)	14	–	2	.875	18	–	8	.692
Toledo	13	–	3	.813	18	–	7	.720
Central Michigan	8	–	8	.500	12	–	14	.462
Bowling Green State	8	–	8	.500	12	–	15	.444
Kent State	7	–	9	.438	12	–	14	.462
Ohio	7	–	9	.438	11	–	15	.423
Ball State	5	–	11	.313	11	–	14	.440
Northern Illinois	2	–	14	.125	5	–	21	.192
Eastern Michigan	1	–	15	.063	7	–	20	.259
Rankings from AP Poll

The 1975–76 Western Michigan Broncos men's basketball team was a National Collegiate Athletic Association (NCAA) Division I college basketball team that played in the Mid-American Conference (MAC). The Broncos, representing Western Michigan University (WMU), finished the season 25–3 overall and 15–1 in the conference, won the MAC championship and reached the Sweet Sixteen of the 1976 NCAA Men's Division I Basketball Tournament. They finished the season ranked No. 10 in the AP Poll and No. 19 in the UPI Poll.

== Season ==
The Broncos were featured in a Sports Illustrated article in the February 9, 1976, issue. After starting the season 16–0, the Broncos entered the AP Poll as the No. 17-ranked team. In the MAC showdown against Miami in Kalamazoo, a Western Michigan University (WMU) record 10,519 fans attended the game.

In an early-season game, WMU beat Wisconsin–Green Bay (UWGB) 51–50 on a put-back by Jeff Tyson with one second left on the clock. The Broncos led by 10 points early in the second half, but UWGB took the lead by one point with 10 seconds remaining. After a timeout, WMU missed a long 25-foot field goal, but Tyson was able to get the rebound and score.

=== NCAA tournament ===
In the NCAA tournament, Western Michigan defeated Virginia Tech 77–67 in overtime. They lost to No. 2-ranked Marquette in the Sweet Sixteen by 5 points, 62–57.

== Roster ==
The following players were on the 1975–76 team:

- Dave Carnegie
- Rod Curry
- Tom Cutter
- Dale DeBruin
- Paul Griffin
- Jimmie Harvey
- Jim Kurzen
- Marty Murray
- Bob Pyykkonen
- Herman Randle
- Mark Rayner
- Mike Reardon
- Dave Rola
- S. L. Sales
- Marc Throop
- Jeff Tyson

The team was coached by Eldon Miller, along with assistant coaches Dick Shilts and Rich Walker.

== Schedule ==
The Broncos finished the season 25–3 and first place in the MAC with a 15–1 record.

Date time, TV	Rank^{#}	Opponent^{#}	Result	Record	Site (attendance) city, state
December 1, 1975*		Grand Valley State	W 107–73	1–0	Read Fieldhouse; Kalamazoo, MI
December 3, 1975*		Wisconsin–Parkside	W 77–74	2–0	Read Fieldhouse; Kalamazoo, MI
December 6, 1975*		at Wisconsin–Green Bay	W 51–50	3–0	Brown County Veterans Memorial Arena (2,052); Ashwaubenon, WI
December 10, 1975*		at Northern Iowa	W 91–61	4–0	McElroy Auditorium (~850); Waterloo, IA
December 13, 1975*		Michigan State	W 78–68	5–0	Read Fieldhouse; Kalamazoo, MI
December 15, 1975*		Detroit	W 81–71	6–0	Read Fieldhouse; Kalamazoo, MI
December 20, 1975*		Wisconsin–Oshkosh	W 115–83	7–0	Read Fieldhouse; Kalamazoo, MI
January 3, 1976		at Bowling Green	W 67–57	8–0 (1–0)	Anderson Arena; Bowling Green, OH
January 7, 1976		at Eastern Michigan	W 78–58	9–0 (2–0)	Bowen Field House; Ypsilanti, MI
January 10, 1976		Toledo	W 78–73	10–0 (3–0)	Read Fieldhouse; Kalamazoo, MI
January 14, 1976*		Loyola (IL)	W 79–77	11–0	Read Fieldhouse; Kalamazoo, MI
January 17, 1976		at Northern Illinois	W 78–65	12–0 (4–0)	Chick Evans Field House; DeKalb, IL
January 21, 1976		Kent State	W 75–53	13–0 (5–0)	Read Fieldhouse; Kalamazoo, MI
January 24, 1976		at Ball State	W 62–57	14–0 (6–0)	Irving Gymnasium; Muncie, IN
January 28, 1976		Miami	W 82–68	15–0 (7–0)	Read Fieldhouse (10,519); Kalamazoo, MI
January 31, 1976		Ohio	W 75–59	16–0 (8–0)	Read Fieldhouse; Kalamazoo, MI
February 4, 1976*	No. 17	at Loyola (IL)	W 80–73	17–0	Alumni Gym; Chicago, IL
February 7, 1976	No. 17	at Central Michigan	W 76–73	18–0 (9–0)	Daniel P. Rose Center; Mount Pleasant, MI
February 11, 1976	No. 15	Eastern Michigan	W 85–73	19–0 (10–0)	Read Fieldhouse; Kalamazoo, MI
February 14, 1976	No. 15	at Toledo	L 80–88	19–1 (10–1)	Field House; Toledo, OH
February 21, 1976	No. 17	Northern Illinois	W 91–74	20–1 (11–1)	Read Fieldhouse; Kalamazoo, MI
February 25, 1976	No. 16	at Kent State	W 73–63	21–1 (12–1)	Memorial Gym; Kent, OH
February 28, 1976	No. 16	Ball State	W 93–67	22–1 (13–1)	Read Fieldhouse; Kalamazoo, MI
March 1, 1976*	No. 16	at No. 8 Notre Dame	L 86–95 ^{OT}	22–2	Athletic and Convocation Center; South Bend, IN
March 3, 1976	No. 14	at Miami	W 73–58	23–2 (14–1)	Millett Hall; Oxford, OH
March 6, 1976	No. 14	Bowling Green	W 71–58	24–2 (15–1)	Read Fieldhouse; Kalamazoo, MI
March 13, 1976*	No. 16	vs. Virginia Tech; NCAA tournament Round of 32	W 77–67 ^{OT}	25–2	Athletic and Convocation Center; South Bend, IN
March 18, 1976*	No. 10	vs. No. 2 Marquette; NCAA tournament Sweet Sixteen	L 57–62	25–3	LSU Assembly Center (14,150); Baton Rouge, LA
*Non-conference game. ^{#}Rankings from AP Poll. (#) Tournament seedings in parentheses.

== Statistics ==
The following table lists the individual player statistics for the season.

Player	GP	GS	Pts	Avg	FG	FGA	Pct	FT	FTA	Pct	Reb	Avg	PF	FO	A
Jeff Tyson	28	28	501	17.9	212	425	.499	77	109	.706	132	4.7	83	3	63
Tom Cutter	28	28	362	12.9	140	217	.645	82	108	.759	298	10.6	84	2	57
Jimmie Harvey	28	28	356	12.7	163	323	.505	30	44	.682	100	3.6	73	1	42
Paul Griffin	28	28	303	10.8	115	192	.599	73	100	.730	277	9.9	82	5	84
Marty Murray	28	0	248	8.9	85	218	.390	78	108	.722	41	1.5	64	2	50
Jim Kurzen	28	28	198	7.1	79	170	.465	40	51	.784	44	1.6	53	0	72
Dave Carnegie	24	0	63	2.6	27	50	.540	9	17	.529	61	2.5	29	0	2
Dale DeBruin	19	0	48	2.5	17	33	.515	14	27	.519	40	2.1	25	0	7
S. L. Sales	18	0	42	2.3	18	40	.450	6	15	.400	19	1.1	15	0	0
Mike Reardon	21	0	40	1.9	17	36	.472	6	11	.545	9	0.4	8	0	0
Herman Randle	21	0	38	1.8	15	50	.300	8	14	.571	9	0.4	7	0	0
Marc Throop	12	0	10	0.8	2	8	.250	6	13	.462	15	1.3	9	0	0
Bob Pyykkonen	5	0	4	0.8	2	6	.333	0	1	.000	3	0.6	1	0	0
Dave Roland	6	0	3	0.5	0	5	.000	3	7	.429	1	0.2	1	0	1
Rod Curry	5	0	2	0.4	1	6	.167	0	0	–	5	1.0	1	0	0
Mark Rayner	1	0	0	0.0	0	0	–	0	0	–	2	2.0	1	0	0
WMU totals	28		2218	79.2	893	1779	.502	432	625	.691	1176	42.0	536	14	392
Opp. totals	28		1898	67.8	776	1817	.427	346	484	.715	–	–	581	–	330
