= 1975–76 Connecticut Huskies men's basketball team =

American college basketball season

1975–76 Connecticut Huskies men's basketball

ECAC Tournament champions

NCAA tournament, Sweet Sixteen
- Conference: Yankee Conference
- Record: 19–10 (7–5 YC)
- Head coach: Dee Rowe (7th season)
- Assistant coaches: Steven F. Bell; Dom Perno
- Home arena: Hugh S. Greer Field House; Hartford Civic Center

1975–76 Yankee Conference men's basketball standings
| | Conf. | | | | Overall |
| Team | W | | L | PCT | W | | L | PCT |
|---|---|---|---|---|---|---|---|---|
| Massachusetts | 11 | – | 1 | .917 | 21 | – | 6 | .778 |
| Connecticut | 7 | – | 5 | .583 | 19 | – | 10 | .655 |
| Rhode Island | 7 | – | 5 | .583 | 14 | – | 12 | .538 |
| Vermont | 6 | – | 6 | .500 | 15 | – | 10 | .600 |
| Maine | 5 | – | 7 | .417 | 14 | – | 11 | .560 |
| New Hampshire | 3 | – | 9 | .250 | 8 | – | 18 | .308 |
| Boston University | 3 | – | 9 | .250 | 7 | – | 19 | .269 |

The 1975–76 Connecticut Huskies men's basketball team represented the University of Connecticut in the 1975–76 collegiate men's basketball season. The Huskies completed the season with a 19–10 overall record. The Huskies were members of the Yankee Conference, where they ended the season with a 7–5 record. They were the champions of the postseason ECAC tournament. They made it to the sweet sixteen in the 1976 NCAA Men's Division I Basketball Tournament. The Huskies played their home games at Hugh S. Greer Field House in Storrs, Connecticut and the Hartford Civic Center in Hartford, Connecticut, and were led by seventh-year head coach Dee Rowe.

== Schedule ==
| Date time, TV | Rank^{#} | Opponent^{#} | Result | Record | Site (attendance) city, state |
Regular season
| 11/28/1975* | | vs. Manhattan; Lapchick Memorial Classic | L 83–99 | 0–1 | Carnesecca Arena; Jamaica, NY |
| 11/29/1975* | | vs. Colgate; Lapchick Memorial Classic | W 62–52 | 1–1 | Carnesecca Arena; Jamaica, NY |
| 12/3/1975* | | Canisius | W 83–69 | 2–1 | Hugh S. Greer Field House; Storrs, CT |
| 12/6/1975* | | Yale | W 71–59 | 3–1 | Hugh S. Greer Field House; Storrs, CT |
| 12/9/1975 | | Boston University | W 95–78 | 4–1 (1–0) | Hugh S. Greer Field House; Storrs, CT |
| 12/13/1975* | | at Rutgers | L 83–96 | 4–2 | College Avenue Gymnasium; New Brunswick, NJ |
| 1/2/1976* | | Boston College | L 83–94 | 4–3 | Hartford Civic Center; Hartford, CT |
| 1/6/1976 | | Vermont | L 85–86 ^{OT} | 4–4 (1–1) | Hugh S. Greer Field House; Storrs, CT |
| 1/9/1976* | | Columbia; UConn Classic | W 98–69 | 5–4 | Hugh S. Greer Field House; Storrs, CT |
| 1/10/1976* | | American; UConn Classic | W 83–70 | 6–4 | Hugh S. Greer Field House; Storrs, CT |
| 1/13/1976* | | at George Washington | L 92–106 | 6–5 | Charles E. Smith Center; Washington, D.C. |
| 1/17/1976 | | at Maine | W 83–69 | 7–5 (2–1) | Memorial Gymnasium; Orono, ME |
| 1/21/1976* | | Manhattan | W 84–66 | 8–5 | Hugh S. Greer Field House; Storrs, CT |
| 1/24/1976 | | at Rhode Island | L 60–63 | 8–6 (2–2) | Keaney Gymnasium; Kingston, RI |
| 1/28/1976* | | at Holy Cross | W 73–69 | 9–6 | Hart Center; Worcester, MA |
| 1/31/1976 | | at Massachusetts | W 72–66 | 10–6 (3–2) | Curry Hicks Cage; Amherst, MA |
| 2/4/1976 | | Boston University | W 78–70 | 11–6 (4–2) | Hugh S. Greer Field House; Storrs, CT |
| 2/7/1976 | | Massachusetts | L 73–86 | 11–7 (4–3) | Hugh S. Greer Field House; Storrs, CT |
| 2/12/1976* | | vs. Lafayette | W 86–79 | 12–7 | Madison Square Garden; New York, NY |
| 2/14/1976 | | at Vermont | W 78–71 | 13–7 (5–3) | Patrick Gym; Burlington, VT |
| 2/19/1976 | | Maine | L 63–64 | 13–8 (5–4) | Hugh S. Greer Field House; Storrs, CT |
| 2/21/1976 | | at New Hampshire | L 82–85 ^{OT} | 13–9 (5–5) | Lundholm Gym; Durham, NH |
| 2/26/1976 | | New Hampshire | W 99–54 | 14–9 (6–5) | Hugh S. Greer Field House; Storrs, CT |
| 2/28/1976 | | Rhode Island | W 76–66 | 15–9 (7–5) | Hugh S. Greer Field House; Storrs, CT |
| 3/2/1976* | | at Fairfield | W 72–70 | 16–9 | Alumni Hall; Fairfield, CT |
ECAC tournament
| 3/4/1976 | | vs. Massachusetts; Semifinals | W 73–69 | 17–9 | Springfield Civic Center; Springfield, MA |
| 3/6/1976* | | vs. Providence; Finals | W 87–73 | 18–9 | Springfield Civic Center; Springfield, MA |
NCAA tournament
| 3/13/1976* | | vs. Hofstra; First Round | W 80–78 | 19–9 | Providence Civic Center; Providence, RI |
| 3/18/1976* | | vs. Rutgers; Sweet Sixteen | L 79–93 | 19–10 | Greensboro Coliseum; Greensboro, NC |
*Non-conference game. ^{#}Rankings from AP Poll. (#) Tournament seedings in parentheses. All times are in Eastern Time.

Schedule Source:
