= 1976 NCAA Division I basketball tournament =

Edition of USA college basketball tournament

- NCAA logo from 1971 to 1979
- Season: 1975–76
- Teams: 32
- Finals site: The Spectrum, Philadelphia, PA
- Champions: Indiana Hoosiers (3rd title, 3rd title game, 4th Final Four)
- Runner-up: Michigan Wolverines (2nd title game, 3rd Final Four)
- Semifinalists: Rutgers Scarlet Knights (1st Final Four); UCLA Bruins (13th Final Four)
- Winning coach: Bob Knight (1st title)
- MOP: Kent Benson (Indiana)
- Attendance: 202,502
- Top scorer: Scott May (Indiana) (113 points)

The 1976 NCAA Division I basketball tournament involved 32 schools playing in single-elimination play to determine the national champion of men's NCAA Division I college basketball. The 38th annual edition of the tournament began on March 13, 1976, and ended with the championship game on March 29, at The Spectrum in Philadelphia. A total of 32 games were played, including a national third-place game.

Indiana, coached by Bob Knight, won the national title with an 86–68 victory in the final game over Michigan, coached by Johnny Orr. Kent Benson of Indiana was named the tournament's Most Outstanding Player.

Notably, this was the first time that two teams from the same conference (the Big Ten) played in the title game. This was also the last men's Division I tournament to date to feature two unbeaten teams, as both Indiana and Rutgers entered the tournament unbeaten. To date, Indiana is the last team to go the entire season undefeated at 32–0. Both advanced to the Final Four, with Indiana winning the title and Rutgers losing to Michigan in the semifinals and UCLA in the third-place game.

This tournament was also the first since the creation of the NCAA men's tournament in 1939 in which no regional third-place games were played. In the first two NCAA tournaments (1939 and 1940), the West Regional held a third-place game, but the East (the only other regional of that day) did not. The East began holding its own third-place game in 1941, and from that point through 1975 each regional held a third-place game. This was the second year of the 32-team field, and the NCAA announced the selections several days prior to the end of the regular season.

As site of the Continental Congress and signing of the Declaration of Independence, Philadelphia also served as host for the 1976 NBA All-Star Game, the 1976 National Hockey League All-Star Game, and the 1976 Major League Baseball All-Star Game at which President Ford threw out the first pitch. The 1976 Pro Bowl was an exception and was played in New Orleans, likely due to weather concerns.

== Schedule and venues ==
1976 first round
1976 Regionals (blue) and Final Four (red)

The following are the sites that were selected to host each round of the 1976 tournament:

First round

- March 13
  - East Region
    - Charlotte Coliseum, Charlotte, North Carolina (Host: Davidson College)
    - Providence Civic Center, Providence, Rhode Island (Host: Providence College)
  - Mideast Region
    - University of Dayton Arena, Dayton, Ohio (Host: University of Dayton)
    - Athletic & Convocation Center, South Bend, Indiana (Host: University of Notre Dame)
  - Midwest Region
    - UNT Coliseum, Denton, Texas (Host: North Texas State University)
    - Allen Fieldhouse, Lawrence, Kansas (Host: University of Kansas)
  - West Region
    - McArthur Court, Eugene, Oregon (Host: University of Oregon)
    - ASU Activity Center, Tempe, Arizona (Host: Arizona State University)

Regional semifinals and finals (Sweet Sixteen and Elite Eight)

- March 18 and 20
  - East Regional, Greensboro Memorial Coliseum, Greensboro, North Carolina (Hosts: Atlantic Coast Conference and North Carolina A&T University)
  - Mideast Regional, LSU Assembly Center, Baton Rouge, Louisiana (Host: Louisiana State University)
  - Midwest Regional, Freedom Hall, Louisville, Kentucky (Host: University of Louisville)
  - West Regional, Pauley Pavilion, Los Angeles, California (Host: UCLA)

National semifinals, 3rd-place game, and championship (Final Four and championship)

- March 27 and 29
  - The Spectrum, Philadelphia, Pennsylvania (Host: Temple University)

== Teams ==
Region	Team	Coach	Conference	Finished	Final opponent	Score
East
East	Connecticut	Dee Rowe	Yankee	Sweet Sixteen	Rutgers	L 93–79
East	DePaul	Ray Meyer	Independent	Sweet Sixteen	VMI	L 71–66
East	Hofstra	Roger Gaeckler	East Coast	Round of 32	Connecticut	L 80–78
East	Princeton	Pete Carril	Ivy League	Round of 32	Rutgers	L 54–53
East	Rutgers	Tom Young	Independent	Fourth Place	UCLA	L 106–92
East	Tennessee	Ray Mears	Southeastern	Round of 32	VMI	L 81–75
East	Virginia	Terry Holland	Atlantic Coast	Round of 32	DePaul	L 69–60
East	VMI	Bill Blair	Southern	Regional Runner-up	Rutgers	L 91–75
Mideast
Mideast	Alabama	C. M. Newton	Southeastern	Sweet Sixteen	Indiana	L 74–69
Mideast	Indiana	Bob Knight	Big Ten	Champion	Michigan	W 86–68
Mideast	Marquette	Al McGuire	Independent	Regional Runner-up	Indiana	L 65–56
Mideast	North Carolina	Dean Smith	Atlantic Coast	Round of 32	Alabama	L 79–64
Mideast	St. John's	Lou Carnesecca	Independent	Round of 32	Indiana	L 90–70
Mideast	Virginia Tech	Don DeVoe	Independent	Round of 32	Western Michigan	L 77–67
Mideast	Western Kentucky	Jim Richards	Ohio Valley	Round of 32	Marquette	L 79–60
Mideast	Western Michigan	Eldon Miller	Mid-American	Sweet Sixteen	Marquette	L 62–57
Midwest
Midwest	Cincinnati	Gale Catlett	Metropolitan	Round of 32	Notre Dame	L 79–78
Midwest	Michigan	Johnny Orr	Big Ten	Runner Up	Indiana	L 86–68
Midwest	Missouri	Norm Stewart	Big Eight	Regional Runner-up	Michigan	L 95–88
Midwest	Notre Dame	Digger Phelps	Independent	Sweet Sixteen	Michigan	L 80–76
Midwest	Syracuse	Roy Danforth	Independent	Round of 32	Texas Tech	L 69–56
Midwest	Texas Tech	Gerald Myers	Southwest	Sweet Sixteen	Missouri	L 86–75
Midwest	Washington	Marv Harshman	Pacific-8	Round of 32	Missouri	L 69–67
Midwest	Wichita State	Harry Miller	Missouri Valley	Round of 32	Michigan	L 74–73
West
West	Arizona	Fred Snowden	Western Athletic	Regional Runner-up	UCLA	L 82–66
West	Boise State	Bus Connor	Big Sky	Round of 32	UNLV	L 103–78
West	Georgetown	John Thompson	Independent	Round of 32	Arizona	L 83–76
West	Memphis State	Wayne Yates	Metropolitan	Round of 32	Pepperdine	L 87–77
West	UNLV	Jerry Tarkanian	Independent	Sweet Sixteen	Arizona	L 114–109
West	Pepperdine	Gary Colson	West Coast	Sweet Sixteen	UCLA	L 70–61
West	San Diego State	Tim Vezie	Pacific Coast	Round of 32	UCLA	L 74–64
West	UCLA	Gene Bartow	Pacific-8	Third Place	Rutgers	W 106–92

== Bracket ==
* – Denotes overtime period

=== East region – Greensboro, North Carolina ===
Quarterfinals
DePaul	69
Virginia	60
Charlotte
VMI	82
Tennessee	75
Rutgers	54
Princeton	53
Providence
Connecticut	80
Hofstra	78*

Regional semifinals
DePaul	66*
VMI	71
Rutgers	93
Connecticut	79

Regional Finals
VMI	75
Rutgers	91

=== Midwest region – Louisville, Kentucky ===
Quarterfinals
Michigan	74
Wichita State	73
Lawrence
Notre Dame	79
Cincinnati	78
Missouri	69
Washington	67
Denton
Texas Tech	69
Syracuse	56

Regional semifinals
Michigan	80
Notre Dame	76
Missouri	86
Texas Tech	75

Regional Finals
Michigan	95
Missouri	88

=== Mideast region – Baton Rouge, Louisiana ===
Quarterfinals
Alabama	79
North Carolina	64
Notre Dame
Indiana	90
St. John's	70
Marquette	79
Western Kentucky	60
Dayton
Western Michigan	77
Virginia Tech	67*

Regional semifinals
Alabama	69
Indiana	74
Marquette	62
Western Michigan	57

Regional Finals
Indiana	65
Marquette	56

=== West region – Los Angeles ===
Quarterfinals
Pepperdine	87
Memphis State	77
Tempe
UCLA	74
San Diego State	64
UNLV	103
Boise State	78
Eugene
Arizona	83
Georgetown	76

Regional semifinals
Pepperdine	61
UCLA	70
UNLV	109*
Arizona	114

Regional Finals
UCLA	82
Arizona	66

=== Final Four – Philadelphia, Pennsylvania ===
National semifinals Saturday, March 27
E	Rutgers	70
MW	Michigan	86
ME	Indiana	65
W	UCLA	51

National Championship Game; Monday, March 29
MW	Michigan	68
ME	Indiana	86
National third-place game
E	Rutgers	92
W	UCLA	106

== Announcers ==
Curt Gowdy, Dick Enberg, and Billy Packer - Final Four at Philadelphia, Pennsylvania; Dick Enberg and Billy Packer called the first game while Packer teamed with Curt Gowdy for the second game. For the Championship Game, Dick Enberg and Curt Gowdy called it while NBC used Billy Packer as a studio analyst.

- Dick Enberg and Billy Packer - First Round at Lawrence, Kansas (Notre Dame-Cincinnati); Mideast Regional Final at Baton Rouge, Louisiana
- Curt Gowdy and John Wooden - First Round at South Bend, Indiana (Indiana-St. John's); West Regional Final at Los Angeles, California
- Jim Simpson (sportscaster) and Tom Hawkins (basketball)- First Round at Dayton, Ohio (Alabama-North Carolina); Midwest Regional Final at Louisville, Kentucky

== See also ==
- 1976 NCAA Division II basketball tournament
- 1976 NCAA Division III basketball tournament
- 1976 National Invitation Tournament
- 1976 NAIA basketball tournament
- 1976 National Women's Invitation Tournament
