= 1975–76 NCAA Division I men's basketball rankings =

- Season: 1975–76
- NCAA Tournament: 1976
- Preseason No. 1: Indiana
- NCAA Tournament Champions: Indiana
NCAA Division I men's basketball rankings


The 1975–76 NCAA Division I men's basketball rankings was made up of two human polls, the AP Poll and the Coaches Poll, in addition to various other preseason polls.

== Legend ==
	Increase in ranking
	Decrease in ranking
	New to rankings from previous week
Italics	Number of first place votes
(#–#)	Win–loss record
т	Tied with team above or below also with this symbol

== AP Poll ==
	Preseason	Week 1 Dec. 1	Week 2 Dec. 8	Week 3 Dec. 15	Week 4 Dec. 22	Week 5 Dec. 29	Week 6 Jan. 5	Week 7 Jan. 12	Week 8 Jan. 19	Week 9 Jan. 26	Week 10 Feb. 2	Week 11 Feb. 9	Week 12 Feb. 16	Week 13 Feb. 23	Week 14 Mar. 1	Week 15 Mar. 8	Final Mar. 15	
1.	Indiana (30)	Indiana (1–0)	Indiana (1–0)	Indiana (3–0)	Indiana (6–0)	Indiana (8–0)	Indiana (10–0)	Indiana (12–0)	Indiana (14–0) (62)	Indiana (16–0)	Indiana (18–0) (60)	Indiana (19–0)	Indiana (21–0)	Indiana (23–0)	Indiana (25–0)	Indiana (26–0) (51)	Indiana (28–0) (47)	1.
2.	UCLA (13)	Maryland (1-0)	Maryland (3–0)	Maryland (5–0)	Maryland (6–0)	Maryland (7–0)	Maryland (10–0)	Maryland (11–1)	UNLV (18–0) (1)	Marquette (14–1)	Marquette (16–1)	Marquette (18–1)	Marquette (19–1)	Marquette (22–1)	Marquette (23–1)	Marquette (25–1) (1)	Marquette (26–1) (2)	2.
3.	Maryland	Marquette (0-0)	Marquette (2–0)	Marquette (3–0)	North Carolina (5–0)	North Carolina (6–0)	UCLA (10–1)	Marquette (9–1)	Maryland (13–1)	UNLV (20–0)	UNLV (23–0) (1)	North Carolina (18–2)	North Carolina (20–2)	Rutgers (23–0)	Rutgers (25–0)	Rutgers (28–0) (1)	UNLV (29–1) (1)	3.
4.	Marquette	North Carolina (1-0)	North Carolina (3–0)	North Carolina (4–0)	UCLA (3–1)	UCLA (6–1)	Marquette (8–1)	UNLV (16–0)	Marquette (11–1)	North Carolina (12–2)	North Carolina (15–2)	Maryland (17–3)	Rutgers (21–0)	North Carolina (22–2)	North Carolina (24–2)	UNLV (28–1) (1)	Rutgers (29–0) (2)	4.
5.	North Carolina	UCLA (0-1)	UCLA (2–1)	Notre Dame (5–1)	Notre Dame (5–1)	Notre Dame (5–1)	UNLV (13–0)	Wake Forest (11–1)	North Carolina (12–1)	Rutgers (15–0)	Maryland (15–3)	Rutgers (19–0)	UCLA (19–3)	UNLV (26–1)	UNLV (26–1)	North Carolina (25–3)	UCLA (24–4)	5.
6.	Kentucky (2)	Louisville (1-0)	Louisville (2–0)	UCLA (2–1)	Cincinnati (7–0)	Marquette (5–1)	North Carolina (7–1)	Washington (13–0)	UCLA (13–2)	Washington (16–1)	Washington (17–1)	UCLA (17–3)	UNLV (24–1)	Notre Dame (20–4)	Alabama (20–3)	UCLA (23–4)	Alabama (22–4)	6.
7.	Notre Dame	Kentucky (0-1)	Tennessee (3–0)	Cincinnati (6–0)	Marquette (5–1)	Cincinnati (8–1)	Wake Forest (10–0)	North Carolina (10–1)	Rutgers (13–0)	Maryland (13–2)	Rutgers (16–0)	UNLV (23–1)	Maryland (18–4)	Alabama (19–3)	UCLA (22–4)	Notre Dame (22–5)	Notre Dame (23–5)	7.
8.	Louisville	Tennessee (0-0)	Notre Dame (3–0)	Alabama (4–0)	Alabama (6–0)	Alabama (6–0)	Washington (11–0)	UCLA (11–2)	Washington (14–1)	NC State (13–2)	Tennessee (14–2)	Tennessee (16–2)	Notre Dame (17–4)	Washington (21–3)	Notre Dame (21–5)	Alabama (21–4)	North Carolina (25–4)	8.
9.	Tennessee (1)	Notre Dame (1-0)	Cincinnati (4–0)	NC State (4–0)	NC State (5–0)	NC State (7–0)	Tennessee (8–1)	Tennessee (9–1)	St. John's (13–1)	Tennessee (12–2)	UCLA (15–3)	Washington (18–2)	Tennessee (17–3)	UCLA (20–4)	Maryland (21–5)	Tennessee (21–5)	Michigan (22–6)	9.
10.	Cincinnati	Cincinnati (2-0)	Arizona (4–0)	Louisville (3–1)	Tennessee (6–1)	UNLV (11–0)	Alabama (8–1)	Rutgers (11–0)	Tennessee (10–2)	Notre Dame (11–3)	NC State (14–3)	Notre Dame (14–4)	Alabama (17–3)	Maryland (19–5)	Washington (22–4)	Missouri (24–4)	Western Michigan (25–2)	10.
11.	Arizona	Arizona (1-0)	Alabama (3–0)	Tennessee (4–1)	Louisville (5–1)	Louisville (7–1)	NC State (8–1)	Alabama (10–1)	NC State (11–2)	Alabama (13–2)	Notre Dame (12–4)	Alabama (15–3)	Washington (19–3)	Tennessee (18–4)	Michigan (20–5)	Washington (22–5)	Maryland (22–6)	11.
12.	Alabama	San Francisco (1-0)	San Francisco (3–0)	Washington (5–0)	UNLV (8–0)	Tennessee (7–1)	Rutgers (10–0)	St. John's (11–1)	Alabama (11–2)	UCLA (14–3)	St. John's (15–2)	NC State (16–4)	NC State (18–4)	Missouri (22–3)	Tennessee (19–5)	Maryland (22–6)	Cincinnati (24–6)	12.
13.	NC State	NC State (1-0)	NC State (3–0)	UNLV (6–0)	Washington (7–0)	Washington (8–0)	Notre Dame (5–3)	NC State (10–1)	Oregon State (11–4)	Missouri (15–2)	Missouri (17–2)	Cincinnati (17–3)	Cincinnati (18–3)	Michigan (18–5)	Cincinnati (21–4)	Virginia (18–11)	Tennessee (21–6)	13.
14.	Kansas State	Alabama (1-0)	Kentucky (0–1)	San Francisco (5–1)	San Francisco (7–1)	Rutgers (7–0)	St. John's (10–1)	Cincinnati (11–2)	Wake Forest (11–3)	St. John's (14–2)	Alabama (13–3)	Missouri (18–3)	Missouri (20–3)	St. John's (20–3)	Western Michigan (22–1)	Michigan (21–6)	Missouri (25–4)	14.
15.	San Francisco	Providence (1-0)	Washington (4–0)	Rutgers (6–0)	Rutgers (7–0)	St. John's (9–0)	Cincinnati (9–2)	Notre Dame (6–3)	Notre Dame (9–3)	Michigan (12–3)	Princeton (12–3)	Western Michigan (18–0)	Michigan (16–5)	NC State (19–5)	Missouri (22–4)	Cincinnati (23–5)	Arizona (23–8)	15.
16.	Michigan	Michigan (1-0)	UNLV (4–0)	Michigan (3–1)	Michigan (5–1)	Minnesota (8–0)	Louisville (7–2)	Michigan (9–3)	Cincinnati (13–2)	Oregon State (12–5)	Cincinnati (15–3)	Michigan (14–5)	St. John's (18–3)	Western Michigan (20–1)	St. John's (21–4)	Western Michigan (24–2)	Texas Tech (25–5)	16.
17.	Providence	Auburn (1-0)	Auburn (2–0)	Auburn (3–0)	St. John's (7–0)	Michigan (5–1)	Minnesota (8–1)	Oregon State (9–4)	Michigan (11–3)	Princeton (11–3)	Western Michigan (16–0)	St. John's (17–3)	Western Michigan (20–1)	Oregon (17–9)	NC State (19–7)	St. John's (23–5)	DePaul (20–8)	17.
18.	Arizona State	Kansas State (1-1)	Michigan (1–1)	St. John's (6–0)	Kentucky (4–3)	Centenary (8–1)	USC (11–1)	Centenary (14–2)	Missouri (14–2)	Cincinnati (13–3)	Centenary (18–3)	Virginia Tech (18–3)	Virginia Tech (19–4)	Cincinnati (19–4)	Florida State (20–5)	Arizona (22–8)	Virginia (18–12)	18.
19.	Memphis State т Auburn т	Arizona State (0-0)	Arizona State (3–0)	Arizona State (5–0)	Centenary (7–1)	San Francisco (9–2)	Michigan (7–2)	West Texas State (10–1)	West Texas State (12–1)	Centenary (16–3)	Virginia Tech (15–3)	Centenary (20–3)	Louisville (17–4)	Centenary (22–4)	Texas A&M (21–5)	Texas Tech (24–5)	Centenary (23–5)	19.
20.	Syracuse	Washington (2-0)	Missouri (4–0)	Kentucky (2–2)	Minnesota (5–0)	La Salle (7–0)	San Francisco (10–3)	Missouri (11–2)	Virginia Tech (12–2)	West Texas State (13–2)	North Texas (16–2)	North Texas (16–2)	Centenary (20–4)	Texas A&M (20–5)	Centenary (23–5)	Centenary (23–5)	Pepperdine (22–5)	20.
	Preseason	Week 1 Dec. 1	Week 2 Dec. 8	Week 3 Dec. 15	Week 4 Dec. 22	Week 5 Dec. 29	Week 6 Jan. 5	Week 7 Jan. 12	Week 8 Jan. 19	Week 9 Jan. 26	Week 10 Feb. 2	Week 11 Feb. 9	Week 12 Feb. 16	Week 13 Feb. 23	Week 14 Mar. 1	Week 15 Mar. 8	Final Mar. 15	
		Dropped: Memphis State; Syracuse	Dropped: Providence; Kansas State (2–2)	Dropped: Arizona (5–2); Missouri	Dropped: Auburn; Arizona State	Dropped: Kentucky	Dropped: Centenary; La Salle	Dropped: Louisville; Minnesota; USC; San Francisco	Dropped: Centenary	Dropped: Wake Forest (11–5); Virginia Tech	Dropped: Michigan (13–4); Oregon State (12–6); West Texas State	Dropped: Princeton (14–4)	Dropped: North Texas	Dropped: Virginia Tech; Louisville (18–5)	Dropped: Oregon	Dropped: NC State; Florida State (20–6); Texas A&M	Dropped: Washington; St. John's	

== UPI Poll ==
	Week 2 Dec. 8	Week 3 Dec. 15	Week 4 Dec. 22	Week 5 Dec. 29	Week 6 Jan. 5	Week 7 Jan. 12	Week 8 Jan. 19	Week 9 Jan. 26	Week 10 Feb. 2	Week 11 Feb. 9	Week 12 Feb. 16	Week 13 Feb. 23	Week 14 Mar. 1	Final Mar. 8	
1.	Indiana (1–0)	Indiana (3–0)	Indiana (6–0)	Indiana (8–0)	Indiana (10–0)	Indiana (12–0)	Indiana (14–0)	Indiana (16–0)	Indiana (18–0)	Indiana (19–0)	Indiana (21–0)	Indiana (23–0)	Indiana (25–0)	Indiana (26–0)	1.
2.	Marquette (2–0)	Marquette (3–0)	Maryland (6–0)	Maryland (7–0)	Maryland (10–0)	Marquette (9–1)	Marquette (11–1)	Marquette (14–1)	Marquette (16–1)	Marquette (18–1)	Marquette (19–1)	Marquette (22–1)	Marquette (23–1)	Marquette (25–1)	2.
3.	Maryland (3–0)	Maryland (5–0)	North Carolina (5–0)	North Carolina (6–0)	UCLA (10–1)	Washington (13–0)	Maryland (13–1)	UNLV (20–0)	North Carolina (15–2)	North Carolina (18–2)	North Carolina (20–2)	North Carolina (22–2)	North Carolina (24–2)	Rutgers (28–0)	3.
4.	North Carolina (3–0)	North Carolina (4–0)	UCLA (3–1)	UCLA (6–1)	Marquette (8–1)	Maryland (11–1)	North Carolina (12–1)	North Carolina (12–2)	UNLV (23–0)	Maryland (17–3)	UCLA (19–3)	Rutgers (23–0)	Rutgers (25–0)	UNLV (28–1)	4.
5.	UCLA (2–1)	UCLA (2–1)	Marquette (5–1)	Marquette (5–1)	Washington (11–0)	Wake Forest (11–1)	UNLV (18–0)	Washington (16–1)	Washington (17–1)	Rutgers (19–0)	Rutgers (21–0)	UNLV (26–1)	UNLV (26–1)	UCLA (23–4)	5.
6.	Tennessee (3–0)	Notre Dame (5–1)	Notre Dame (5–1)	Notre Dame (5–1)	UNLV (13–0)	UNLV (16–0)	Washington (14–1)	Rutgers (15–0)	Maryland (15–3)	UCLA (17–3)	UNLV (24–1)	Notre Dame (20–4)	UCLA (22–4)	North Carolina (25–3)	6.
7.	Louisville (2–0)	Alabama (4–0)	Alabama (6–0)	Alabama (6–0)	Wake Forest (10–0)	North Carolina (10–1)	UCLA (13–2)	Maryland (13–2)	Rutgers (17–0)	Tennessee (16–2)	Maryland (18–4)	UCLA (20–4)	Alabama (20–3)	Alabama (21–4)	7.
8.	Notre Dame (3–0)	UNLV (6–0)	UNLV (8–0)	NC State (7–0)	North Carolina (7–1)	UCLA (11–2)	Rutgers (13–0)	Alabama (13–2)	Tennessee (14–2)	UNLV (23–1)	Washington (19–3)	Maryland (19–5)	Maryland (21–5)	Notre Dame (22–5)	8.
9.	Arizona (4–0)	Cincinnati (6–0)	Cincinnati (7–0)	UNLV (11–0) т	Alabama (8–1)	Alabama (10–1)	Alabama (11–2)	Tennessee (12–2)	UCLA (15–3)	Washington (18–2)	Tennessee (17–3)	Washington (21–3)	Michigan (20–5)	Michigan (21–6)	9.
10.	Alabama (2–0)	Tennessee (4–1)	Louisville (5–1)	Louisville (7–1) т	St. John's (10–1)	Tennessee (9–1)	St. John's (13–1)	UCLA (14–3)	NC State (14–3) т	Notre Dame (14–4)	Notre Dame (17–4)	Alabama (19–3)	Notre Dame (21–5)	Washington (22–5)	10.
11.	Cincinnati (4–0) т	Washington (5–0)	Michigan (5–1)	St. John's (9–0)	Rutgers (10–0)	Rutgers (11–0)	Oregon State (11–4)	Notre Dame (11–3)	Missouri (17–2) т	Michigan (14–5)	Michigan (16–5)	Michigan (18–5)	Washington (22–4)	Missouri (24–4)	11.
12.	UNLV (4–0) т	Michigan (3–1)	NC State (5–0)	Washington (8–0)	Tennessee (8–1)	St. John's (11–1)	Tennessee (10–2)	NC State (13–2)	Notre Dame (12–4)	Alabama (15–3)	Missouri (20–3)	Tennessee (18–4)	Florida State (20–5)	Arizona (22–8)	12.
13.	Washington (4–0)	NC State (4–0)	Washington (7–0)	Tennessee (7–1)	Michigan (7–2)	Michigan (9–3)	NC State (11–2)	Michigan (12–3)	St. John's (15–2)	Missouri (18–3)	Alabama (17–3)	Missouri (22–3)	Tennessee (19–5)	Maryland (22–4)	13.
14.	San Francisco (3–0)	Rutgers (6–0)	Tennessee (6–1)	Cincinnati (8–1)	Notre Dame (5–3)	NC State (10–1)	Michigan (11–3)	Missouri (15–2)	Michigan (13–4)	Utah (16–4)	Louisville (17–4)	St. John's (20–3)	Missouri (22–4)	Tennessee (21–5)	14.
15.	USC (4–0)	Louisville (3–1)	Rutgers (7–0)	Michigan (5–1)	USC (11–1)	Missouri (11–2)	Missouri (14–2)	Oregon State (12–5)	Alabama (13–3)	NC State (16–4)	NC State (18–4)	Louisville (18–5)	Arizona (21–8)	Virginia (18–11)	15.
16.	Kentucky (0–1)	San Francisco (5–1)	San Francisco (7–1)	Rutgers (7–0)	NC State (8–1)	Notre Dame (6–3)	Notre Dame (9–3)	St. John's (14–2)	Utah (14–4)	Louisville (16–4)	St. John's (18–3)	Texas (20–5)	St. John's (21–4)	Cincinnati (23–5) т	16.
17.	Rutgers (3–0)	St. John's (6–0)	St. John's (7–0)	San Francisco (9–2)	Louisville (7–2) т	Arizona State (8–1) т	Wake Forest (11–3)	Utah (12–4)	Louisville (13–4)	Western Michigan (18–0)	Cincinnati (18–3) т	Florida State (18–5)	Louisville (19–6)	Florida State (20–6) т	17.
18.	NC State (3–0)	Arizona State (5–0)	Kentucky (4–3)	Iowa (9–0)	Missouri (10–2) т	DePaul (9–2) т	West Texas State (12–1)	West Texas State (13–2)	Oregon State (12–6)	St. John's (17–3)	San Francisco (21–4) т	NC State (19–5)	Cincinnati (21–4)	St. John's (23–5)	18.
19.	Michigan (1–1)	Arizona (5–2)	Arizona State (6–1) т	Minnesota (8–0)	Kentucky (5–4)	West Texas State (10–1)	Utah (11–4)	Princeton (11–3)	Princeton (12–3)	Cincinnati (17–3) т	Utah (17–5)	Cincinnati (19–4)	Western Michigan (22–1)	Western Michigan (24–2) т	19.
20.	Kansas State (2–2)	Wichita State (3–0)	Kansas State (5–0) т USC (7–1) т	Duquesne (5–1)	Iowa (10–1)	Oregon State (9–4)	Cincinnati (13–2)	Wake Forest (11–5)	Cincinnati (15–3)	West Texas State (15–3) т	Texas A&M (17–5)	Arizona (19–8)	NC State (19–7)	Princeton (22–4) т	20.
	Week 2 Dec. 8	Week 3 Dec. 15	Week 4 Dec. 22	Week 5 Dec. 29	Week 6 Jan. 5	Week 7 Jan. 12	Week 8 Jan. 19	Week 9 Jan. 26	Week 10 Feb. 2	Week 11 Feb. 9	Week 12 Feb. 16	Week 13 Feb. 23	Week 14 Mar. 1	Final Mar. 8	
		Dropped: USC; Kentucky; Kansas State	Dropped: Arizona; Wichita State	Dropped: Kentucky; Arizona State; Kansas State; USC	Dropped: Cincinnati; San Francisco; Minnesota (8–1); Duquesne	Dropped: USC; Louisville; Kentucky; Iowa	Dropped: Arizona State; DePaul	Dropped: Cincinnati (13–3)	Dropped: West Texas State; Wake Forest	Dropped: Oregon State; Princeton	Dropped: Western Michigan (20–1); West Texas State	Dropped: San Francisco; Utah	Dropped: Texas A&M (21–5)	Dropped: NC State; Centenary (23–5)	
