= 1975–76 St. John's Redmen basketball team =

American college basketball season

1975–76 St. John's Redmen men's basketball

Lapchick Memorial Champions ECAC Holiday Festival, Second Place Cougar Classic Champions

1976 NCAA tournament, First round
- Conference: Independent

Ranking
- Coaches: No. 18
- Record: 23–6
- Head coach: Lou Carnesecca
- Assistant coaches: John Kresse; Brian Mahoney
- Captains: Frank Alagia; William Smith
- Home arena: Alumni Hall; Madison Square Garden

The 1975–76 St. John's Redmen basketball team represented St. John's University in the 1976 NCAA Men's Division I Basketball Tournament. The team was coached by Lou Carnesecca in his eighth year at the school. St. John's home games are played at Alumni Hall and Madison Square Garden.

1975–76 St. John's Red Storm men's basketball team
Players
Coaches

Pos.	#	Name	Height	Weight	Year	Previous school	Hometown
G/F	-	Gordon Thomas (I)	6 ft 4 in (1.93 m)	—	Fr	Bay Shore	Bay Shore, NY
G	-	Bill Clarke	6 ft 2 in (1.88 m)	—	So	Archbishop Molloy	Rosedale, NY
G/F	-	Kevelin Winfree	6 ft 5 in (1.96 m)	—	So	Alexander Hamilton	Brooklyn, NY
G	4	Tom Calabrese	6 ft 0 in (1.83 m)	—	Fr	Cliffside Park	Cliffside Park, NJ
G	10	Frank Alagia (C)	5 ft 9 in (1.75 m)	—	Sr	St. Agnes	Rockville Centre, NY
G/F	22	Beaver Smith (C)	6 ft 4 in (1.93 m)	—	Sr	South Side	Rockille Centre, NY
F	24	George Johnson	6 ft 7 in (2.01 m)	—	So	New Utrecht	Brooklyn, NY
G/F	32	Glen Williams	6 ft 4 in (1.93 m)	—	Jr	Laurinburg Prep	St. Thomas, USVI
C	33	Paul Berwanger (redshirt)	6 ft 10 in (2.08 m)	—	Jr	Cornwall Central/Boston College	Cornwall, NY
F	35	Cecil Rellford	6 ft 6 in (1.98 m)	—	RS Jr	Suncoast/Kentucky State	Riviera Beach, FL
F	42	John Farmer	6 ft 5 in (1.96 m)	—	RS Sr	St. John the Baptist/Hofstra	Brentwood, NY
F	44	Rudy Wright (I)	6 ft 7 in (2.01 m)	—	Fr	Long Island City	Queens, NY
C	52	Tom Weadock	6 ft 11 in (2.11 m)	—	RS Jr	Power Memorial/San Jacinto	New York, NY

Head coach

- Lou Carnesecca (St. John's, '50)

Assistant coach(es)

- John Kresse (St. John's, '64)
- Brian Mahoney (Manhattan, '71)

Legend

- (C) Team captain
- (S) Suspended
- (I) Ineligible
- (W) Walk-on
- Injured
- Current redshirt

== Schedule and results ==
Date time, TV	Rank^{#}	Opponent^{#}	Result	Record	Site city, state
Regular season
11/28/75*		Colgate; Lapchick Tournament Opening Round	W 74-51	1-0	Alumni Hall; Queens, NY
11/29/75*		Manhattan; Lapchick tournament championship	W 79-72	2-0	Alumni Hall; Queens, NY
12/06/75*		Davidson	W 91-79	3-0	Alumni Hall; Queens, NY
12/09/75*		No. 7 Tennessee	W 79-70	4-0	Alumni Hall; Queens, NY
12/12/75*		vs. Tulsa; Cougar Classic Semifinal	W 78-62	5-0	Marriott Center; Provo, UT
12/13/75*		at Brigham Young; Cougar Classic Championship	W 78-65	6-0	Marriott Center; Provo, UT
12/20/75*	No. 18	American	W 78-66	7-0	Alumni Hall; Queens, NY
12/27/75*	No. 17	vs. Temple; ECAC Holiday Festival Quarterfinal	W 67-59	8-0	Madison Square Garden; New York, NY
12/29/75*	No. 17	vs. South Carolina; ECAC Holiday Festival Semifinal	W 71-59	9-0	Madison Square Garden; New York, NY
12/30/75*	No. 15	vs. No. 1 Indiana; ECAC Holiday Festival Championship	L 69-76	9-1	Madison Square Garden; New York, NY
01/03/76*	No. 15	St. Joseph's	W 75-62	10-1	Alumni Hall; Queens, NY
01/10/76*	No. 14	Temple	W 70-63	11-1	The Palestra; Philadelphia, PA
01/12/76*	No. 15	Hawaii	W 74-71 ^{OT}	12-1	Alumni Hall; Queens, NY
01/17/76*	No. 12	Villanova	W 57-53	13-1	Alumni Hall; Queens, NY
01/21/76*	No. 9	at Boston College	W 53-51	14-1	Roberts Center; Chestnut Hill, MA
01/24/76*	No. 9	at Princeton	L 55-58 ^{OT}	14-2	Jadwin Gymnasium; Princeton, NJ
01/26/76*	No. 9	Manhattan	W 78-72	15-2	Alumni Hall; Queens, NY
02/01/76*	No. 14	Army	W 87-75 ^{OT}	16-2	Alumni Hall; Queens, NY
02/04/76*	No. 12	at Georgetown	L 73-74 ^{OT}	16-3	McDonough Gymnasium; Washington, D.C.
02/07/76*	No. 12	Fordham	W 77-67	17-3	Madison Square Garden; New York, NY
02/10/76*	No. 17	at Rhode Island	W 56-47	18-3	Keaney Gymnasium; Kingston, RI
02/16/76*	No. 17	Seton Hall	W 68-63	19-3	Alumni Hall; Queens, NY
02/21/76*	No. 16	Syracuse	W 100-78	20-3	Alumni Hall; Queens, NY
02/23/76*	No. 16	Holy Cross	W 71-60	21-3	Alumni Hall; Queens, NY
02/28/76*	No. 14	at Providence	L 53-67	21-4	Providence Civic Center; Providence, RI
03/01/76*	No. 14	at Niagara	W 65-64	22-4	NU Student Center; Lewiston, NY
ECAC Metro tournament
03/04/76	No. 16	vs. St. Peter's; ECAC Metro Semifinal	W 75-67	23-4	Jadwin Gymnasium; Princeton, NY
03/06/76	No. 16	vs. No. 3 Rutgers; ECAC Metro Final	L 67-70	23-5	Madison Square Garden; New York, NY
NCAA tournament
03/13/76*	No. 17	vs. No. 1 Indiana; NCAA Regional Quarterfinal	L 70-90	23-6	Athletic & Convocation Center; South Bend, IN
*Non-conference game. ^{#}Rankings from AP Poll. (#) Tournament seedings in parentheses.

== Team players drafted into the NBA ==
Round	Pick	Player	NBA club
5	76	Beaver Smith	New York Knicks
