= 1975–76 NCAA Division I men's basketball season =

Basketball season

- Preseason AP No. 1: Indiana Hoosiers
- NCAA Tournament: 1976
- Tournament dates: March 13 – 29, 1976
- National Championship: The Spectrum; Philadelphia, Pennsylvania
- NCAA Champions: Indiana Hoosiers
- Helms National Champions: Indiana Hoosiers
- Other champions: Kentucky Wildcats (NIT)
- Player of the Year (Naismith, Wooden): Scott May, Indiana Hoosiers
- Player of the Year (Helms): Kent Benson, Indiana Hoosiers; Scott May, Indiana Hoosiers

The 1975–76 NCAA Division I men's basketball season began in November 1975, progressed through the regular season and conference tournaments, and concluded with the 1976 NCAA Men's Division I Basketball Tournament Championship Game on March 29, 1976, at the Spectrum in Philadelphia, Pennsylvania. The Indiana Hoosiers won their third NCAA national championship with a 86–68 victory over the Michigan Wolverines.

== Season headlines ==
- The Metro Conference began play, with six original members.
- The last basketball season for the Yankee Conference, which dropped all sports except football at the end of the season.
- Indiana went undefeated (32–0) during the season.
- In the Pacific 8 Conference, UCLA won its 10th of what would ultimately be 13 consecutive conference titles.
- The National Invitation Tournament contracted from 16 to 12 teams.
- Two African-American head coaches met in an NCAA tournament game for the first time, when Fred Snowden’s Arizona Wildcats faced John Thompson’s Georgetown Hoyas in a first-round game on March 13, 1976.
- Two teams from the same conference played in the NCAA championship game for the first time, when Big Ten Conference members Indiana and Michigan met on March 29, 1976.
  - Such an occurrence was impossible prior to the 1975 tournament, since only one team per conference could qualify from 1939 through 1974.
- Bob Knight of Indiana became the first head coach to win the NCAA championship after playing for an NCAA championship team. He had played for the 1960 champion Ohio State team.

== Season outlook ==
=== Pre-season polls ===
The top 20 from the AP Poll during the pre-season.

'Associated Press'
Ranking	Team
1	Indiana (30)
2	UCLA (13)
3	Maryland
4	Marquette
5	North Carolina
6	Kentucky (2)
7	Notre Dame
8	Louisville
9	Tennessee (1)
10	Cincinnati
11	Arizona
12	Alabama
13	NC State
14	Kansas State
15	San Francisco
16	Michigan
17	Providence
18	Arizona State
19 (tie)	Memphis State
19 (tie)	Auburn
20	Syracuse

UPI Coaches
Ranking	Team
1	Indiana
2	Marquette
3	Maryland
4	North Carolina
5	UCLA
6	Tennessee
7	Louisville
8	Notre Dame
9	Arizona
10	Alabama
11	Cincinnati
12	UNLV
13	Washington
14	San Francisco
15	USC
16	Kentucky
17	Rutgers
18	NC State
19	Michigan
20	Kansas State

== Conference membership changes ==
School	Former conference	New conference
Ball State Cardinals	Division I independent	Mid-American Conference
Cal State Los Angeles Golden Eagles	Division I independent	California Collegiate Athletic Association (D–II)
Cincinnati Bearcats	Division I independent	Metro Conference
Georgia Tech Yellow Jackets	Division I independent	Metro Conference
Houston Cougars	Division I independent	Southwest Conference
Louisville Cardinals	Missouri Valley Conference	Metro Conference
Memphis State Tigers	Division I independent	Metro Conference
UNLV Runnin' Rebels	West Coast Athletic Conference	Division I independent
New Orleans Privateers	Division II independent	Division I independent
North Texas State Mean Green	Missouri Valley Conference	Division I independent
Northern Illinois Huskies	Division I independent	Mid-American Conference
Saint Louis Billikens	Division I independent	Metro Conference
Southern Illinois Salukis	Division I independent	Missouri Valley Conference
Tulane Green Wave	Division I independent	Metro Conference

== Regular season ==
=== Conferences ===
==== Conference winners and tournaments ====
Conference	Regular season winner	Conference player of the year	Conference tournament	Tournament venue (City)	Tournament winner
Atlantic Coast Conference	North Carolina	Mitch Kupchak, North Carolina	1976 ACC men's basketball tournament	Capital Centre (Landover, Maryland)	Virginia
Big Eight Conference	Missouri	Willie Smith, Missouri	No Tournament		
Big Sky Conference	Boise State, Idaho State, & Weber State	None selected	1976 Big Sky Conference men's basketball tournament	Swenson Gym (Ogden, Utah)	Boise State
Big Ten Conference	Indiana	None Selected	No Tournament		
East Coast Conference	Saint Joseph's (East); Lafayette (West)	Todd Tripucka, Lafayette	1976 East Coast Conference men's basketball tournament	The Palestra (Philadelphia, Pennsylvania)	Hofstra
Eastern College Athletic; Conference (ECAC)	Division I ECAC members played as independents during the regular season (see note)		1976 ECAC Metro Region tournament	Jadwin Gymnasium (Princeton, New Jersey)	Rutgers
Eastern College Athletic; Conference (ECAC)	Division I ECAC members played as independents during the regular season (see note)		1976 ECAC New England Region tournament	Springfield Civic Center (Springfield, Massachusetts)	Connecticut
Eastern College Athletic; Conference (ECAC)	Division I ECAC members played as independents during the regular season (see note)		1976 ECAC Southern Region tournament	WVU Coliseum (Morgantown, West Virginia)	Georgetown
Eastern College Athletic; Conference (ECAC)	Division I ECAC members played as independents during the regular season (see note)		1976 ECAC Upstate Region tournament	Manley Field House (Syracuse, New York)	Syracuse
Ivy League	Princeton	Armond Hill, Princeton	No Tournament		
Metro Conference	Tulane	Gary Yoder, Cincinnati	1976 Metro Conference men's basketball tournament	Freedom Hall (Louisville, Kentucky)	Cincinnati
Mid-American Conference	Western Michigan	Jeff Tyson, Western Michigan	No Tournament		
Missouri Valley Conference	Wichita State	Mike Glenn, Southern Illinois	No Tournament		
Ohio Valley Conference	Western Kentucky	Johnny Britt, Western Kentucky, & Tom Sisneros, Middle Tennessee	1976 Ohio Valley Conference men's basketball tournament	E.A. Diddle Arena (Bowling Green, Kentucky) (Semifinals and Finals)	Western Kentucky
Pacific-8 Conference	UCLA	Ron Lee, Oregon	No Tournament		
Pacific Coast Athletic Association	Long Beach State & Cal State Fullerton	Steve Copp, San Diego State, & Greg Bunch, Cal State Fullerton	1976 Pacific Coast Athletic Association men's basketball tournament	Stockton Memorial Civic Auditorium (Stockton, California)	San Diego State
Southeastern Conference	Alabama	Bernard King, Tennessee	No Tournament		
Southern Conference	VMI	Rodney McKeever, The Citadel	1976 Southern Conference men's basketball tournament	Greenville Memorial Auditorium (Greenville, South Carolina) (Semifinals and Finals)	VMI
Southland Conference	Louisiana Tech	Mike McConathy, Louisiana Tech	No Tournament		
Southwest Conference	Texas A&M	Ira Terrell, SMU	1976 Southwest Conference men's basketball tournament	Moody Coliseum (Dallas, Texas)	Texas Tech
West Coast Athletic Conference	Pepperdine	Marcos Leite, Pepperdine	No Tournament		
Western Athletic Conference	Arizona	None Selected	No Tournament		
Yankee Conference	Massachusetts	None Selected	No Tournament		

NOTE: From 1975 to 1981, the Eastern College Athletic Conference (ECAC), a loosely organized sports federation of colleges and universities in the Northeastern United States, organized Division I ECAC regional tournaments for those of its members that were independents in basketball. Each 1976 tournament winner received an automatic bid to the 1976 NCAA Men's Division I Basketball Tournament in the same way that the tournament champions of conventional athletic conferences did.

==== Conference standings ====
1975–76 ACC men's basketball standings
	Conf.				Overall
Team	W		L	PCT	W		L	PCT
No. 8 North Carolina	11	–	1	.917	25	–	4	.862
No. 11 Maryland	7	–	5	.583	22	–	6	.786
NC State	7	–	5	.583	21	–	9	.700
Clemson	5	–	7	.417	18	–	10	.643
Wake Forest	5	–	7	.417	17	–	10	.630
No. 18 Virginia †	4	–	8	.333	18	–	12	.600
Duke	3	–	9	.250	13	–	14	.481
† 1976 ACC tournament winner Rankings from AP Poll

1975–76 Big Eight Conference men's basketball standings
	Conf.				Overall
Team	W		L	PCT	W		L	PCT
No. 14 Missouri	12	–	2	.857	26	–	5	.839
Kansas State	11	–	3	.786	20	–	8	.714
Nebraska	10	–	4	.714	19	–	8	.704
Kansas	6	–	8	.429	13	–	13	.500
Oklahoma	6	–	8	.429	9	–	17	.346
Oklahoma State	4	–	10	.286	10	–	16	.385
Colorado	4	–	10	.286	7	–	19	.269
Iowa State	3	–	11	.214	3	–	24	.111
Rankings from AP poll

1975–76 Big Sky men's basketball standings
	Conf.				Overall
Team	W		L	PCT	W		L	PCT
Weber State	9	–	5	.643	21	–	11	.656
Boise State †	9	–	5	.643	18	–	11	.621
Idaho State	9	–	5	.643	16	–	11	.593
Northern Arizona	8	–	6	.571	15	–	12	.556
Montana	7	–	7	.500	13	–	12	.520
Montana State	6	–	8	.429	9	–	16	.360
Gonzaga	5	–	9	.357	13	–	13	.500
Idaho	3	–	11	.214	7	–	19	.269
† Big Sky Conference tournament winner

1975–76 Big Ten Conference men's basketball standings
	Conf.				Overall
Team	W		L	PCT	W		L	PCT
No. 1 Indiana	18	–	0	1.000	32	–	0	1.000
No. 9 Michigan	14	–	4	.778	25	–	7	.781
Purdue	11	–	7	.611	16	–	11	.593
Michigan State	10	–	8	.556	14	–	13	.519
Iowa	9	–	9	.500	19	–	10	.655
Minnesota	8	–	10	.444	16	–	10	.615
Illinois	7	–	11	.389	14	–	13	.519
Northwestern	7	–	11	.389	12	–	15	.444
Wisconsin	4	–	14	.222	10	–	16	.385
Ohio State	2	–	16	.111	6	–	20	.231
Rankings from AP Poll

1975–76 ECC men's basketball standings
	Conf.				Overall
Team	W		L	PCT	W		L	PCT
East
Saint Joseph's	4	–	1	.800	10	–	16	.385
Hofstra †	3	–	2	.600	18	–	12	.600
Temple	3	–	2	.600	9	–	18	.333
Drexel	3	–	2	.600	17	–	6	.739
American	1	–	4	.200	9	–	16	.360
La Salle	1	–	4	.200	11	–	15	.423
West
Lafayette	9	–	1	.900	19	–	7	.731
Rider	6	–	4	.600	14	–	13	.519
Bucknell	5	–	5	.500	13	–	13	.500
Delaware	4	–	6	.400	10	–	15	.400
West Chester	4	–	6	.400	8	–	17	.320
Lehigh	2	–	8	.200	9	–	15	.375
† 1976 ECC tournament winner Rankings from AP Poll

1975–76 Ivy League men's basketball standings
	Conf.				Overall
Team	W		L	PCT	W		L	PCT
Princeton	14	–	0	1.000	22	–	5	.815
Penn	11	–	3	.786	17	–	9	.654
Dartmouth	7	–	7	.500	16	–	10	.615
Columbia	6	–	8	.429	8	–	17	.320
Brown	6	–	8	.429	7	–	19	.269
Yale	5	–	9	.357	7	–	21	.250
Cornell	4	–	10	.286	8	–	18	.308
Harvard	3	–	11	.214	8	–	18	.308
Rankings from AP Poll

1975–76 Metro Conference men's basketball standings
	Conf.				Overall
Team	W		L	PCT	W		L	PCT
Tulane	1	–	0	1.000	18	–	9	.667
No. 12 Cincinnati †	2	–	1	.667	25	–	6	.806
Louisville	2	–	1	.667	20	–	8	.714
Memphis State	1	–	1	.500	21	–	9	.700
Georgia Tech	0	–	1	.000	13	–	14	.481
Saint Louis	0	–	2	.000	13	–	14	.481
† 1976 Metro Conference tournament winner Rankings from AP Poll

1975–76 Mid-American Conference men's basketball standings
	Conf.				Overall
Team	W		L	PCT	W		L	PCT
No. 10 Western Michigan	15	–	1	.938	25	–	3	.893
Miami (Ohio)	14	–	2	.875	18	–	8	.692
Toledo	13	–	3	.813	18	–	7	.720
Central Michigan	8	–	8	.500	12	–	14	.462
Bowling Green State	8	–	8	.500	12	–	15	.444
Kent State	7	–	9	.438	12	–	14	.462
Ohio	7	–	9	.438	11	–	15	.423
Ball State	5	–	11	.313	11	–	14	.440
Northern Illinois	2	–	14	.125	5	–	21	.192
Eastern Michigan	1	–	15	.063	7	–	20	.259
Rankings from AP Poll

1975–76 Missouri Valley Conference men's basketball standings
	Conf.				Overall
Team	W		L	PCT	W		L	PCT
Wichita State	10	–	2	.833	18	–	10	.643
Southern Illinois	9	–	3	.750	16	–	10	.615
West Texas State	8	–	4	.667	19	–	7	.731
New Mexico State	4	–	8	.333	15	–	12	.556
Bradley	4	–	8	.333	13	–	13	.500
Tulsa	4	–	8	.333	9	–	18	.333
Drake	3	–	9	.250	8	–	19	.296
Rankings from AP Poll

1975–76 Ohio Valley Conference men's basketball standings
	Conf.				Overall
Team	W		L	PCT	W		L	PCT
Western Kentucky †	11	–	3	.786	20	–	9	.690
Austin Peay State	10	–	4	.714	20	–	7	.741
Morehead State	7	–	7	.500	13	–	14	.481
Tennessee Tech	7	–	7	.500	14	–	10	.583
Middle Tennessee	6	–	8	.429	16	–	12	.571
Eastern Kentucky	6	–	8	.429	10	–	15	.400
Murray State	5	–	9	.357	9	–	17	.346
East Tennessee State	4	–	10	.286	6	–	20	.231
† 1976 OVC tournament winner Rankings from AP Poll

1975–76 Pacific-8 Conference men's basketball standings
	Conf.				Overall
Team	W		L	PCT	W		L	PCT
No. 5 UCLA	12	–	2	.857	27	–	5	.844
Oregon State	10	–	4	.714	18	–	9	.667
Oregon	10	–	4	.714	19	–	11	.633
Washington	9	–	5	.643	22	–	6	.786
Washington State	8	–	6	.571	18	–	8	.692
California	4	–	10	.286	12	–	14	.462
Stanford	3	–	11	.214	9	–	18	.333
USC	0	–	14	.000	11	–	16	.407
Rankings from AP Poll

1975–76 Pacific Coast Athletic Association men's basketball standings
	Conf.				Overall
Team	W		L	PCT	W		L	PCT
Cal State Fullerton	6	–	4	.600	15	–	10	.600
Long Beach State	6	–	4	.600	14	–	12	.538
San Jose State	5	–	5	.500	17	–	10	.630
San Diego State†	5	–	5	.500	16	–	13	.552
Pacific	4	–	6	.400	14	–	14	.500
Fresno State	4	–	6	.400	12	–	14	.462
† 1976 PCAA Tournament winner Rankings from AP Poll

1975–76 Southeastern Conference men's basketball standings
	Conf.				Overall
Team	W		L	PCT	W		L	PCT
No. 6 Alabama	15	–	3	.833	23	–	5	.821
No. 13 Tennessee	14	–	4	.778	21	–	6	.778
Vanderbilt	12	–	6	.667	16	–	11	.593
Kentucky	11	–	7	.611	20	–	10	.667
Auburn	11	–	7	.611	16	–	10	.615
Florida	7	–	11	.389	12	–	14	.462
Georgia	7	–	11	.389	12	–	15	.444
Mississippi State	6	–	12	.333	13	–	13	.500
LSU	5	–	13	.278	12	–	14	.462
Ole Miss	2	–	16	.111	6	–	21	.222
Rankings from AP Poll

1975–76 Southern Conference men's basketball standings
	Conf.				Overall
Team	W		L	PCT	W		L	PCT
VMI†	9	–	3	.750	22	–	10	.688
William & Mary	8	–	3	.727	15	–	13	.536
Richmond	7	–	7	.500	14	–	14	.500
East Carolina	7	–	7	.500	11	–	15	.423
Appalachian State	6	–	6	.500	13	–	14	.481
The Citadel	6	–	7	.462	10	–	17	.370
Furman	5	–	7	.417	9	–	18	.333
Davidson	1	–	9	.100	5	–	21	.192
† Southern Conference Tournament winner Rankings from AP Poll

1975–76 Southland Conference men's basketball standings
	Conf.				Overall
Team	W		L	PCT	W		L	PCT
Louisiana Tech	9	–	1	.900	15	–	11	.577
McNeese State	7	–	3	.700	16	–	11	.593
Lamar	6	–	4	.600	10	–	14	.417
Southwestern Louisiana	4	–	6	.400	7	–	19	.269
Arkansas State	3	–	7	.300	10	–	15	.400
Texas-Arlington	1	–	9	.100	6	–	21	.222
Rankings from AP Poll

1975–76 Southwest Conference men's basketball standings
	Conf.				Overall
Team	W		L	PCT	W		L	PCT
Texas A&M	14	–	2	.875	21	–	6	.778
No. 16 Texas Tech†	13	–	3	.813	25	–	6	.806
SMU	10	–	6	.625	16	–	12	.571
Arkansas	9	–	7	.563	19	–	9	.679
Baylor	8	–	8	.500	12	–	15	.444
Houston	7	–	9	.438	17	–	11	.607
TCU	6	–	10	.375	11	–	16	.407
Texas	4	–	12	.250	9	–	17	.346
Rice	1	–	15	.063	3	–	24	.111
† 1976 SWC tournament winner Rankings from AP Poll

1975–76 West Coast Athletic Conference men's basketball standings
	Conf.				Overall
Team	W		L	PCT	W		L	PCT
No. 20 Pepperdine	10	–	2	.833	22	–	6	.786
San Francisco	9	–	3	.750	22	–	8	.733
Nevada	7	–	5	.583	12	–	14	.462
Seattle*	6	–	6	.500	11	–	16	.407
Santa Clara	4	–	8	.333	10	–	16	.385
Loyola Marymount	4	–	8	.333	7	–	19	.269
Saint Mary's	2	–	10	.167	3	–	23	.115
Rankings from AP Poll

1975–76 WAC men's basketball standings
	Conf.				Overall
Team	W		L	PCT	W		L	PCT
No. 15 Arizona	11	–	3	.786	24	–	9	.727
UTEP	9	–	5	.643	19	–	7	.731
Utah	9	–	5	.643	19	–	8	.704
New Mexico	8	–	6	.571	16	–	11	.593
BYU	6	–	8	.429	12	–	14	.462
Colorado State	6	–	8	.429	10	–	14	.417
Arizona State	5	–	9	.357	16	–	11	.593
Wyoming	2	–	12	.143	10	–	17	.370
Rankings from AP Poll

1975–76 Yankee Conference men's basketball standings
	Conf.				Overall
Team	W		L	PCT	W		L	PCT
Massachusetts	11	–	1	.917	21	–	6	.778
Connecticut	7	–	5	.583	19	–	10	.655
Rhode Island	7	–	5	.583	14	–	12	.538
Vermont	6	–	6	.500	15	–	10	.600
Maine	5	–	7	.417	14	–	11	.560
New Hampshire	3	–	9	.250	8	–	18	.308
Boston University	3	–	9	.250	7	–	19	.269

=== Division I independents ===
A total of 77 college teams played as Division I independents. Among them, Rutgers (31–2) had both the best winning percentage (.939) and the most wins.

1975–76 NCAA Division I men's basketball independents standings
	Conf.				Overall
Team	W		L	PCT	W		L	PCT
No. 4 Rutgers		–		–	31	–	2	.939
No. 3 UNLV		–		–	29	–	2	.935
No. 2 Marquette		–		–	27	–	2	.931
North Texas State		–		–	22	–	4	.846
No. 19 Centenary		–		–	22	–	5	.815
UNC Charlotte		–		–	24	–	6	.800
Pan American		–		–	20	–	5	.800
No. 7 Notre Dame		–		–	23	–	6	.793
St. John's		–		–	23	–	6	.793
Florida State		–		–	21	–	6	.778
Oral Roberts		–		–	20	–	6	.769
Georgetown		–		–	21	–	7	.750
Virginia Tech		–		–	21	–	7	.750
George Washington		–		–	20	–	7	.741
Illinois State		–		–	20	–	7	.741
Creighton		–		–	19	–	7	.731
Northeast Louisiana		–		–	18	–	7	.720
Detroit		–		–	19	–	8	.704
South Florida		–		–	19	–	8	.704
New Orleans		–		–	18	–	8	.692
No. 17 DePaul		–		–	20	–	9	.690
Syracuse		–		–	20	–	9	.690
Holy Cross		–		–	22	–	10	.688
Seton Hall		–		–	18	–	9	.667
South Alabama		–		–	18	–	9	.667
South Carolina		–		–	18	–	9	.667
Providence		–		–	21	–	11	.656
Stetson		–		–	17	–	9	.654
UC Santa Barbara		–		–	17	–	9	.654
Air Force		–		–	16	–	9	.640
VCU		–		–	16	–	9	.640
St. Peter's		–		–	19	–	11	.633
Portland State		–		–	17	–	10	.630
St. Bonaventure		–		–	17	–	10	.630
Mercer		–		–	15	–	10	.600
Villanova		–		–	16	–	11	.593
Niagara		–		–	17	–	12	.586
Long Island		–		–	15	–	12	.556
Colgate		–		–	13	–	11	.542
Xavier		–		–	14	–	12	.538
West Virginia		–		–	15	–	13	.536
Georgia State		–		–	12	–	11	.522
Indiana State		–		–	13	–	12	.520
Dayton		–		–	14	–	13	.519
Hardin–Simmons		–		–	14	–	13	.519
Jacksonville		–		–	13	–	13	.500
Manhattan		–		–	14	–	14	.500
St. Francis (PA)		–		–	14	–	14	.500
St. Francis (NY)		–		–	13	–	13	.500
Marshall		–		–	13	–	14	.481
Duquesne		–		–	12	–	13	.480
Northeastern		–		–	12	–	13	.480
Fairfield		–		–	12	–	14	.462
Utah State		–		–	12	–	14	.462
Butler		–		–	12	–	15	.444
Denver		–		–	12	–	15	.444
Pittsburgh		–		–	12	–	15	.444
Army		–		–	11	–	14	.440
Iona		–		–	11	–	15	.423
Milwaukee		–		–	11	–	15	.423
Southern Miss		–		–	11	–	15	.423
Navy		–		–	10	–	14	.417
Fairleigh Dickinson		–		–	9	–	13	.409
Georgia Southern		–		–	11	–	16	.407
Hawaii		–		–	11	–	16	.407
Penn State		–		–	10	–	15	.400
Buffalo		–		–	10	–	16	.385
Loyola (IL)		–		–	10	–	16	.385
Canisius		–		–	10	–	17	.370
Boston College		–		–	9	–	17	.346
Oklahoma City		–		–	9	–	18	.333
Portland		–		–	9	–	18	.333
Fordham		–		–	7	–	19	.269
Cleveland State		–		–	6	–	19	.240
Houston Baptist		–		–	5	–	21	.192
Baptist		–		–	3	–	23	.115
Samford		–		–	3	–	23	.115
Rankings from AP Poll

=== Informal championships ===
Conference	Regular season winner	Most Valuable Player
Philadelphia Big 5	Saint Joseph's & Villanova	Charlie Wise, La Salle

Saint Joseph's and Villanova both finished with 3–1 records in head-to-head competition among the Philadelphia Big 5.

== Post-season tournaments ==
=== NCAA tournament ===
==== Final Four ====
National semifinals
E	Rutgers	70
MW	Michigan	86
ME	Indiana	65
W	UCLA	51

National finals
MW	Michigan	68
ME	Indiana	86
Third place
E	Rutgers	92
W	UCLA	106

=== National Invitation tournament ===
==== Semifinals & finals ====
Semifinals
UNC Charlotte	80
NC State	79
Kentucky	79
Providence	78

Finals
UNC Charlotte	67
Kentucky	71
Third place
NC State	74
Providence	69

== Awards ==
=== Consensus All-American teams ===
Consensus First Team
Player	Position	Class	Team
Kent Benson	C	Junior	Indiana
Adrian Dantley	F	Junior	Notre Dame
John Lucas	G	Senior	Maryland
Scott May	F	Senior	Indiana
Richard Washington	F/C	Junior	UCLA

Consensus Second Team
Player	Position	Class	Team
Phil Ford	G	Sophomore	North Carolina
Bernard King	F	Sophomore	Tennessee
Mitch Kupchak	F/C	Senior	North Carolina
Phil Sellers	G	Senior	Rutgers
Earl Tatum	G/F	Senior	Marquette

=== Major player of the year awards ===
- Naismith Award: Scott May, Indiana
- Helms Player of the Year: Kent Benson, Indiana, & Scott May, Indiana
- Associated Press Player of the Year: Scott May, Indiana
- UPI Player of the Year: Scott May, Indiana
- NABC Player of the Year: Scott May, Indiana
- Oscar Robertson Trophy (USBWA): Adrian Dantley, Notre Dame
- Adolph Rupp Trophy: Scott May, Indiana
- Sporting News Player of the Year: Scott May, Indiana

=== Major coach of the year awards ===
- Associated Press Coach of the Year: Bob Knight, Indiana
- Henry Iba Award (USBWA): Johnny Orr, Michigan
- NABC Coach of the Year: Johnny Orr, Michigan
- UPI Coach of the Year: Tom Young, Rutgers
- Sporting News Coach of the Year: Tom Young, Rutgers

=== Other major awards ===
- Frances Pomeroy Naismith Award (Best player under 6'0): Frank Alagia, St. John's
- Robert V. Geasey Trophy (Top player in Philadelphia Big 5): Charlie Wise, La Salle
- NIT/Haggerty Award (Top player in New York City metro area): Phil Sellers, Rutgers

== Coaching changes ==
A number of teams changed coaches throughout the season and after the season ended.

Team	Former Coach	Interim Coach	New Coach	Reason
Arkansas State	John Rose		Marvin Adams	
Bowling Green State	Pat Haley		John Weinert	
Colgate	Bill Vesp		Mike Griffin	
Colorado	Sox Walseth		Bill Blair	
Davidson	Robert Brickles		Dave Pritchett	
Delaware	Donald Harnum		Ronald Rainey	
East Tennessee State	Leroy Fisher		Sonny Smith	
Eastern Kentucky	Bob Mulcahy		Ed Byhre	
Eastern Michigan	Allan Freund		Ray Scott	
Fordham	Hal Wissel		Dae Stewart	
Hawaii	Bruce O'Neil	Rick Pitino	Larry Little	
Iowa State	Ken Trickey		Lynn Nance	
Lamar	Jack Martin		Billy Tubbs	
Michigan State	Gus Ganakas		Jud Heathcote	
Montana	Jud Heathcote		Jim Brandenburg	Heathcote left to coach Michigan State.
Navy	Dave Smalley		Bob Hamilton	
Nevada	Jim Padgett		Jim Carey	
Niagara	Frank Layden		Dan Raskin	
Northern Illinois	Emory Luck		John McDougal	
Ohio State	Fred Taylor		Eldon Miller	
Ole Miss	Cob Jarvis		Bob Weltlich	
Pan American	Abe Lemons		Bill White	
Southern Miss	Jeep Clark		M. K. Turk	
Syracuse	Roy Danforth		Jim Boeheim	Roy Danforth departed for the head coaching position at Tulane. Boeheim, Danforth's lead assistant, held the position for 47 seasons.
Tennessee Tech	Connie Inman		Cliff Malpass	
Texas	Leon Black		Abe Lemons	
Texas–Pan American	Abe Lemons		Bill White	
Tulane	Charles Moir		Roy Danforth	Danforth succeeded Charles Moir, who left the Green Wave for Virginia Tech.
Texas–Arlington	Barry Dowd		Bob "Snake" LeGrand	
Vanderbilt	Roy Skinner		Wayne Dobbs	
VCU	Chuck Noe		Dana Kirk	
Virginia Tech	Don DeVoe		Charles Moir	
VMI	Bill Blair		Charlie Schmaus	Blair left to coach Colorado.
Western Michigan	Eldon Miller		Dick Shilts	
Wyoming	Moe Radovich		Don DeVoe	
