= 1976 NCAA Division I basketball championship game =

1976 NCAA Tournament Championship Game
National championship game
| Indiana Hoosiers | Michigan Wolverines |
| Big Ten | Big Ten |
| (31–0) | (25–6) |
|---|---|
| 86 | 68 |
| Head coach: Bob Knight | Head coach: Johnny Orr |
- AP: 1
- Coaches: 1
- AP: 9
- Coaches: 9
| | 1st half | 2nd half | Total |
|---|---|---|---|
| Indiana Hoosiers | 29 | 57 | 86 |
| Michigan Wolverines | 35 | 33 | 68 |
- Date: March 29, 1976
- Venue: The Spectrum, Philadelphia, Pennsylvania
- Referees: Irv Brown, Bob Wortman
- Attendance: 17,540

United States TV coverage
- Network: NBC
- Announcers: Curt Gowdy and Dick Enberg

The 1976 NCAA Division I Basketball Championship Game was the final of the 1976 NCAA Division I basketball tournament and determined the national champion for the 1975–76 season. The game was held at the Spectrum in Philadelphia, Pennsylvania, on March 29, 1976. In a matchup of two Big Ten Conference teams, the Indiana Hoosiers defeated the Michigan Wolverines 86–68 to earn the university's third championship. The Hoosiers' victory concluded the last undefeated season in Division I men's college basketball.

== Background ==
=== Indiana Hoosiers ===
The Hoosiers were coached by Bob Knight, who was in his fifth season with the team. Indiana was coming off of a 1974–75 season in which they had a perfect 18–0 record in Big Ten Conference play and remained undefeated overall until losing in the regional finals of the 1975 NCAA Tournament. Among the players from the 1974–75 team lost to graduation was Steve Green, the Hoosiers' top scorer. However, they retained a veteran core, and the 1975–76 squad had four seniors and one junior included as regular starters. Forward Scott May was the Hoosiers' leading scorer in 1975–76, averaging 23.5 points per game. Center Kent Benson, the team's leading rebounder with 8.8 rebounds, contributed 17.3 points per game, and forward Tom Abernethy averaged 10.0 points. Guard Bob Wilkerson led Indiana with 5.3 assists per game and added 7.8 points, and fellow guard Quinn Buckner posted averages of 8.9 points and 4.2 assists. All five players later competed in the National Basketball Association, as did forward Wayne Radford. Other players on the Hoosiers' roster included guards Bob Bender, Jim Crews, and Jim Wisman, and forward Rich Valavicius.

Indiana began the season as the number-one ranked team in the country. The team's first game, on November 29, 1975, was against UCLA, the previous season's national champions. By a 20-point margin, the Hoosiers opened with a win. After an 83–59 win over Florida State, the Hoosiers had two consecutive games against top-15 teams. On December 11, against Notre Dame, the Hoosiers withstood a late Fighting Irish rally to post a 63–60 victory. Four days later, they were forced into overtime against Kentucky before winning by nine points, 77–68. After four wins by margins of over 20 points, the Hoosiers faced 17th-ranked St. John's at Madison Square Garden, winning 76–69. Entering the beginning of the Big Ten schedule, Indiana's record stood at 9–0.

The Hoosiers' first Big Ten game was on January 3, 1976, at Ohio State. By a 68–66 score, they improved to 10–0 on the season. After a 17-point win over Northwestern, they played on the road against 19th-ranked Michigan, in a game they won 80–74. Two double-digit victories followed, before a four-point win against Purdue. Having improved to 18–0 with three further wins, Indiana again faced Michigan, and the Wolverines took them to overtime before the Hoosiers managed a five-point triumph. During the rest of the regular season, the Hoosiers' only game with a margin of less than 10 points was their second meeting with Purdue, who lost to Indiana 74–71. The Hoosiers maintained their number-one ranking throughout the season, and entered the NCAA Tournament with a perfect 27–0 record.

In the first round of the NCAA Tournament, Indiana again faced St. John's, winning by 20 points. Alabama gave the Hoosiers a more competitive game in the regional semifinals, but by a 74–69 margin, the Hoosiers advanced to the regional final, where they defeated Marquette 65–56. That win gave the Hoosiers a spot in the Final Four, where they won 65–51 over UCLA to claim a berth in the national championship game. It was the third title game appearance for Indiana, and its first since 1953.

=== Michigan Wolverines ===
Johnny Orr, who was in his eighth season with the team, was Michigan's head coach in 1975–76. The Wolverines reached the 1975 NCAA Tournament, but were eliminated in their first game. Michigan had three future NBA players on its roster. Guard Rickey Green was the team's leading scorer with an average of 19.9 points per game. Forward Phil Hubbard added 15.1 points per game, and led the Wolverines in rebounding with 11.0 per game. Freshman guard Alan Hardy also played in the NBA later in his career. Forwards John Robinson and Wayman Britt, and guard Steve Grote, averaged double-figure points per game. Other players on the Wolverines included centers Tom Bergen and Joel Thompson, and guard Dave Baxter.

After beginning the season with a 90–63 win against Vanderbilt on December 2, the Wolverines lost at eighth-ranked Tennessee by one point, 82–81. Michigan posted five consecutive victories before playing another ranked team, 10th-ranked UNLV, who defeated them 108–94 in Las Vegas. The loss left the Wolverines at 6–2 entering their Big Ten schedule. Michigan won its first three Big Ten games, including a 95–72 result against 16th-ranked Minnesota on January 5. The six-point loss to Indiana was the Wolverines' first in conference play, and left the team at 9–3 on the season.

Victories over Ohio State, Michigan State, and Purdue followed, before a one-point defeat at Illinois. After two further wins, the Wolverines posted their second loss to the Hoosiers. Over the last eight games of the season, they won seven, all but one of which were conference games; only Minnesota defeated them during this stretch. The Wolverines had a 21–6 record prior to the NCAA Tournament, and their 14–4 record in Big Ten games was second-best in the conference.

The Wolverines' first opponent in the NCAA Tournament was Wichita State, who lost to Michigan by only one point, 74–73. In another close game in the regional semifinals, the Wolverines advanced over Notre Dame by an 80–76 final score, before they defeated Missouri by seven points to secure a Final Four appearance. In that round, the Wolverines faced Rutgers; like the Hoosiers, the Scarlet Knights entered the round undefeated for the season, with a record of 31–0. However, Michigan jumped out to a 17-point lead by halftime and went on to give Rutgers their first loss, 86–70. The victories by Indiana and Michigan set up an NCAA championship game between teams who were members of the same conference, the first time that had happened. The Wolverines had appeared in one previous NCAA tournament final, losing in 1965 to UCLA.

== Game summary ==
The contest was held on March 29, 1976, at the Spectrum in Philadelphia, Pennsylvania. The announced crowd was 17,540 fans. A third-place game was held between the two losers of the national semifinals, Rutgers and UCLA. The Bruins won 106–92, as Marques Johnson led all scorers with 30 points.

In the first half, the Hoosiers were forced to deal with the absence of starter Wilkerson, who was injured within the first three minutes and taken to a hospital. The Wolverines made 61.5% of their field goal attempts, and entering halftime they held the lead, 35–29. Benson and May helped the Hoosiers gain a foothold early in the second half, combining to score the team's first 10 points. The pair, along with Buckner, were responsible for all but two of the Hoosiers' first 38 points in the half. Indiana tied the score at 39–39; although Michigan did claim a 43–41 lead six minutes into the half, the teams were tied six further times. Britt, who was defending May, found himself in foul trouble and was forced out of the game with four fouls less than four minutes into the second half; he ultimately fouled out, along with Hubbard. With 10:15 remaining in regulation, the teams were tied, 51–51. Twenty seconds later, May scored a basket to put Indiana in front. The Hoosiers scored the next three points; Abernethy contributed two points before Benson added a free throw that made the score 56–51.

At the time Hubbard fouled out, there were under eight minutes left and the Hoosiers held a six-point advantage. Fifteen minutes into the second half, Indiana had extended their lead to double digits, 69–59. The Hoosiers were in the midst of a 22–8 scoring run that gave them a comfortable lead of 73–59 inside the last four minutes of regulation. Indiana was able to expand their lead further before the end of the game, wrapping up an 86–68 victory that gave them the national championship and a perfect record for the season. It was the third national title won by the Hoosiers, following triumphs in 1940 and 1953. They became the fourth Division I program to conclude a perfect season with an NCAA Tournament title, and the team's 32 wins tied the 1956–57 North Carolina Tar Heels for the most by an NCAA champion that ended the season unbeaten. The 1975–76 Hoosiers were the seventh men's national champion with a perfect record. As of 2023, they are the last Division I men's basketball team to finish undefeated for an entire season.

== Statistical summary ==
The Hoosiers converted 32 of their 61 field goal attempts, or 52.5%. May hit 10 of his 17 shots and scored a game-high 26 points while adding eight rebounds; 18 of his points were scored in the second half. Benson had a team-high nine rebounds and 25 points, 15 of which came in the second half. Buckner added 16 points and five steals, while Abernethy also had a double-figure point total, 11. Wisman had six assists, the most by a player on either team.

Michigan had a lower field goal percentage than Indiana, converting at a 47.4% rate (27 for 57). Green was the top scorer for the Wolverines, posting 18 points on 7–16 shooting. Grote had 12 points and Britt had 11, while Hubbard scored 10 points and had 11 rebounds, the high amount for both teams. Robinson had a team-high five assists and contributed eight points.

== Box score ==
NBC

March 29, 1976

Box score

#1 Indiana Hoosiers 86, #9 Michigan Wolverines 64
Scoring by half: 29-35, 57-33
| Pts: Scott May 26; Rebs: Kent Benson 9 Asts: Jim Wisman 6 | Pts: Rickey Green 18; Rebs: Phil Hubbard 11; Asts: John Robinson 5 |

The Spectrum, Philadelphia, Pennsylvania
Attendance: 17,540
Referees: Irv Brown, Bob Wortman

== Aftermath ==
Having lost several starters from the 1976 NCAA title game to graduation, the Hoosiers posted a 16–11 record in the 1976–77 season, including an 11–7 mark in Big Ten play, and did not qualify for the 1977 NCAA Tournament. The team returned to the tournament the following season, reaching the regional semifinals before being eliminated. Over the next decade, Knight's Hoosiers won two further national championship games, in 1981 and 1987.

Having set a program record with 25 wins in 1975–76, Michigan surpassed its mark the following season, when it had a 26–4 record, including 16 wins in 18 Big Ten games. The Wolverines reached the NCAA Tournament, where they were knocked out in the regional finals. After 1977, the team did not return to the tournament until 1985. Michigan would eventually win the national championship in 1989.
