= 1975–76 Indiana Hoosiers men's basketball team =

American college basketball season

1975–76 Indiana Hoosiers men's basketball

NCAA tournament National champions NCAA Division I regular season champions Big Ten champions ECAC Holiday Festival champions

National Championship Game, W 86–68 vs. Michigan
- Conference: Big Ten Conference

Ranking
- Coaches: No. 1
- AP: No. 1
- Record: 32–0 (18–0 Big Ten)
- Head coach: Bob Knight (5th season)
- Assistant coaches: Harold Andreas; Bob Donewald; Bob Weltlich
- Captains: Quinn Buckner; Scott May
- Home arena: Assembly Hall

1975–76 Big Ten Conference men's basketball standings
	Conf.				Overall
Team	W		L	PCT	W		L	PCT
No. 1 Indiana	18	–	0	1.000	32	–	0	1.000
No. 9 Michigan	14	–	4	.778	25	–	7	.781
Purdue	11	–	7	.611	16	–	11	.593
Michigan State	10	–	8	.556	14	–	13	.519
Iowa	9	–	9	.500	19	–	10	.655
Minnesota	8	–	10	.444	16	–	10	.615
Illinois	7	–	11	.389	14	–	13	.519
Northwestern	7	–	11	.389	12	–	15	.444
Wisconsin	4	–	14	.222	10	–	16	.385
Ohio State	2	–	16	.111	6	–	20	.231
Rankings from AP Poll

The 1975–76 Indiana Hoosiers men's basketball team represented Indiana University Bloomington and were the winners of the NCAA Men's Division I Tournament, the school's third national championship. The Hoosiers included three All-Americans and were led by head coach Bob Knight, in his fifth year, to an undefeated 32–0 record. The team played its home games in Assembly Hall in Bloomington, Indiana, and was a member of the Big Ten Conference. They remain, as of the 2025–26 season, the last team to be undefeated National Champions.

== Roster ==
No.	Name	Position	Ht.	Year	Hometown
20	Bob Wilkerson	G/F	6–6	Sr.	Anderson, Indiana
21	Quinn Buckner	G	6–3	Sr.	Phoenix, Illinois.
22	Wayne Radford	G/F	6–3	So.	Indianapolis, Indiana
23	Jim Wisman	G	6–2	So.	Quincy, Illinois
25	Bob Bender	G	6–3	Fr.	Bloomington, Illinois
31	Scott Eells	F	6–9	Fr.	Hoopeston, Illinois
32	Mark Haymore	F/C	6–8	So.	Shaker Heights, Ohio
33	Tom Abernethy	F	6–7	Sr.	South Bend, Indiana
34	Rich Valavicius	F	6–5	Fr.	Hammond, Indiana
42	Scott May	F	6–7	Sr.	Sandusky, Ohio
43	Jim Roberson	C	6–9	Fr.	Rochester, New York
45	Jim Crews	G	6–5	Sr.	Normal, Illinois
54	Kent Benson	C	6–11	Jr.	New Castle, Indiana

The team manager was Chuck Swenson.

== Regular season ==
The team entered the season ranked No. 1. The Hoosiers ended the regular season unbeaten, a feat that has been accomplished only seven times since, by the Larry Bird-led 1979 Indiana State Sycamores, the 1979 Alcorn State Braves, the 1991 UNLV Runnin' Rebels, the 2004 Saint Joseph's Hawks, the 2014 Wichita State Shockers, the 2015 Kentucky Wildcats, the 2021 Gonzaga Bulldogs, and the 2026 Miami (OH) RedHawks. All but Alcorn State and Saint Joseph's, and Miami (OH) would enter the NCAA Tournament unbeaten.

== Schedule ==
Date time, TV	Rank^{#}	Opponent^{#}	Result	Record	Site city, state
Regular season
11/29/1975*; NBC	No. 1	vs. No. 2 UCLA	W 84–64	1–0	St. Louis Arena; St. Louis, Missouri
12/8/1975*	No. 1	vs. Florida State	W 83–59	2–0	Market Square Arena; Indianapolis, Indiana
12/11/1975*	No. 1	No. 8 Notre Dame	W 63–60	3–0	Assembly Hall; Bloomington, Indiana
12/15/1975*	No. 1	vs. No. 14 Kentucky; Indiana–Kentucky rivalry	W 77–68 ^{OT}	4–0	Freedom Hall; Louisville, Kentucky
12/19/1975*	No. 1	Georgia; Indiana Classic	W 93–56	5–0	Assembly Hall; Bloomington, Indiana
12/20/1975*	No. 1	Virginia Tech; Indiana Classic	W 101–74	6–0	Assembly Hall; Bloomington, Indiana
12/26/1975*	No. 1	vs. Columbia; Holiday Festival	W 106–63	7–0	Madison Square Garden; New York City, New York
12/27/1975*	No. 1	vs. Manhattan; Holiday Festival	W 97–61	8–0	Madison Square Garden; New York City, New York
12/28/1975*	No. 1	vs. No. 17 St. John's; Holiday Festival	W 76–69	9–0	Madison Square Garden; New York City, New York
1/3/1976	No. 1	at Ohio State	W 66–64	10–0 (1–0)	St. John Arena; Columbus, Ohio
1/5/1976	No. 1	Northwestern	W 78–61	11–0 (2–0)	Assembly Hall; Bloomington, Indiana
1/10/1976	No. 1	at No. 19 Michigan	W 80–74	12–0 (3–0)	Crisler Arena; Ann Arbor, Michigan
1/12/1976	No. 1	at Michigan State	W 69–57	13–0 (4–0)	Jenison Fieldhouse; East Lansing, Michigan
1/17/1976	No. 1	at Illinois; Rivalry	W 83–55	14–0 (5–0)	Assembly Hall; Champaign, Illinois
1/19/1976	No. 1	Purdue; Rivalry	W 71–67	15–0 (6–0)	Assembly Hall; Bloomington, Indiana
1/24/1976	No. 1	at Minnesota	W 85–76	16–0 (7–0)	Williams Arena; Minneapolis
1/26/1976	No. 1	at Iowa	W 88–73	17–0 (8–0)	Iowa Field House; Iowa City, Iowa
1/31/1976	No. 1	Wisconsin	W 114–61	18–0 (9–0)	Assembly Hall; Bloomington, Indiana
2/7/1976	No. 1	Michigan	W 72–67 ^{OT}	19–0 (10–0)	Assembly Hall; Bloomington, Indiana
2/9/1976	No. 1	Michigan State	W 85–70	20–0 (11–0)	Assembly Hall; Bloomington, Indiana
2/14/1976	No. 1	Illinois; Rivalry	W 58–48	21–0 (12–0)	Assembly Hall; Bloomington, Indiana
2/16/1976	No. 1	at Purdue; Rivalry	W 74–71	22–0 (13–0)	Mackey Arena; West Lafayette, Indiana
2/21/1976	No. 1	Minnesota	W 76–64	23–0 (14–0)	Assembly Hall; Bloomington, Indiana
2/23/1976	No. 1	Iowa	W 101–81	24–0 (15–0)	Assembly Hall; Bloomington, Indiana
2/26/1976	No. 1	at Wisconsin	W 96–67	25–0 (16–0)	Wisconsin Field House; Madison, Wisconsin
3/1/1976	No. 1	at Northwestern	W 76–63	26–0 (17–0)	Welsh-Ryan Arena; Evanston, Illinois
3/6/1976	No. 1	Ohio State	W 96–67	27–0 (18–0)	Assembly Hall; Bloomington, Indiana
NCAA Tournament
3/13/1976*	No. 1	vs. No. 17 St. John's; Quarterfinals	W 90–70	28–0 (18–0)	Joyce Center; Notre Dame, Indiana
3/18/1976*	No. 1	vs. No. 6 Alabama; Sweet Sixteen	W 74–69	29–0 (18–0)	LSU Assembly Center; Baton Rouge, Louisiana
3/20/1976*	No. 1	vs. No. 2 Marquette; Elite Eight	W 65–56	30–0 (18–0)	LSU Assembly Center; Baton Rouge, Louisiana
3/27/1976*	No. 1	vs. No. 5 UCLA; Final Four	W 65–51	31–0 (18–0)	The Spectrum; Philadelphia
3/29/1976*	No. 1	vs. No. 9 Michigan; Championship	W 86–68	32–0 (18–0)	The Spectrum; Philadelphia
*Non-conference game. ^{#}Rankings from AP Poll. (#) Tournament seedings in parentheses.

== Awards and honors ==
- Kent Benson, NCAA Men's MOP Award
- Bob Knight, Big Ten Coach of the Year
- Scott May, National Player of the Year
- Scott May, Big Ten Player of the Year

== Team players drafted into the NBA ==
Year	Round	Pick	Player	NBA club
1976	1	2	Scott May	Chicago Bulls
1976	1	7	Quinn Buckner	Milwaukee Bucks
1976	1	11	Bob Wilkerson	Seattle SuperSonics
1976	3	43	Tom Abernethy	Los Angeles Lakers
1977	1	1	Kent Benson	Milwaukee Bucks
1978	2	27	Wayne Radford	Indiana Pacers
1979	6	119	Bob Bender	San Diego Clippers
