= Terry Furlow =

American basketball player (1954-1980)

Personal information
- Born: October 18, 1954 Flint, Michigan, U.S.
- Died: May 23, 1980 (aged 25) Linndale, Ohio, U.S.
- Listed height: 6 ft 5 in (1.96 m)
- Listed weight: 190 lb (86 kg)

Career information
- High school: Flint Northern (Flint, Michigan)
- College: Michigan State (1972–1976)
- NBA draft: 1976: 1st round, 12th overall pick
- Drafted by: Philadelphia 76ers
- Playing career: 1976–1980
- Position: Shooting guard / small forward
- Number: 25

Career history
- 1976–1977: Philadelphia 76ers
- 1977–1979: Cleveland Cavaliers
- 1979: Atlanta Hawks
- 1979–1980: Utah Jazz

Career highlights
- Third-team All-American – AP, UPI (1976)

Career NBA statistics
- Points: 2,550 (10.7 ppg)
- Rebounds: 507 (2.1 rpg)
- Assists: 568 (2.4 apg)
- Stats at NBA.com
- Stats at Basketball Reference

Terry L. Furlow (October 18, 1954 – May 23, 1980) was an American basketball player.

== Amateur career ==
Furlow was a 6-foot-4-inch (1.93 m) shooting guard from Flint, Michigan who played high school basketball at Flint Northern High School. With Northern and coach Bill Frieder, Furlow won back-to-back state Class A championships, including an undefeated team in his senior year (1971–72). Furlow paired with fellow future NBA player Wayman Britt and led the team in scoring as a senior with 14.8 ppg as Northern defeated Pontiac Central High School 86–81 to cap a 25–0 season at Jenison Fieldhouse in East Lansing.

1972 Flint Northern vs. Pontiac Central

He would continue his career in East Lansing and played collegiately for Michigan State. In 1975–76, as a senior, he led the Big Ten in scoring with 29.4 ppg, and finished his career at MSU with 1717 points. The 50 points he scored against Iowa on January 5, 1976, remains the Michigan State men's all-time single-game scoring record.

Controversially, Furlow was one of a number of black players who walked out on coach Gus Ganakas before a key Big Ten game on January 4, 1975, against Indiana. Ganakas elected to start Jeff Tropf, who was white, Furlow and 9 other black players, led by captain Lindsay Hairston, walked out of the team meeting, returned for the game but were then suspended by Ganakas. Michigan State lost the game 107–55 with a patchwork roster that included junior varsity players. Tropf led the team with 21 points. The players would meet with Ganakas the next day, aired a number of grievances, were reinstated after apologizing, and then defeated Ohio State 88-84 the next day. Tropf would transfer to Central Michigan at the end of the season.

Furlow also befriended a young Lansing high school player named Magic Johnson, who said about Furlow, "I never seen a young man work as hard as Terry Furlow to develop his game. If it hadn't been for Terry when he went to Michigan State, I was still a young guy just coming into high school and he used to say 'Come on and meet me' at what we used to call the old men's gym. We would work out and he would beat me like 15-0 and he beat me a bad 15-0. I would have my head down and he would say 'pick your head up. I'm supposed to beat you 15-0 and I'm going to keep beating you until you finally respond.' So he made me so mad, right? But he improved my game and next year I came back and he only beat me 15-2. He said 'see, you're getting better.' And then we kept playing." Johnson was a pallbearer at Furlow's funeral.

== Professional career ==
Furlow was selected by the Philadelphia 76ers with the 12th overall pick in the 1976 NBA draft; he was also selected in the sixth round of the 1975 ABA draft by the Memphis Sounds. Unable to find time on a deep 76ers team, despite his bond with teammate Julius Erving, Furlow was traded to the Cleveland Cavaliers for two first-round picks, where he averaged 11.0 points in nearly two seasons with the team. In January 1979, he was traded to the Atlanta Hawks for point guard Butch Lee, and then, midway through the 1979–80 season, he was traded to the Utah Jazz, averaging a career best 16.0 ppg. Twice in his sole season with the Jazz, Furlow scored a career high 37 points, once on December 25, 1979, and again two weeks later on January 5, 1980.

== Personal life ==
Furlow was part of a growing problem in the 1970s NBA with cocaine and illegal drug use. Mike Fratello, who was an assistant coach with Atlanta under Hubie Brown during Furlow's tenure in Atlanta said, “He was competitive as hell. He'd fight you in a game, and he understood the toughness of the NBA. There were some other things that he just couldn’t get past.”

On May 23, 1980, Furlow was killed in a car accident when he crashed into a pole on Interstate 71 at 120 mph in Linndale, Ohio after spending the night with former teammate Foots Walker. An autopsy report confirmed he had cocaine and Valium in his bloodstream when he died, with open beer and marijuana in the car.

Furlow was inducted into the Greater Flint Area Sports Hall of Fame in 1991 and into the Greater Flint Afro-American Hall of Fame in 2005.

Furlow left behind one son, Terrence O'Neal Paige from Hammond, Indiana. He also now has a granddaughter, Nyah.

== Career statistics ==
Legend
GP	Games played	GS	Games started	MPG	Minutes per game
FG%	Field goal percentage	3P%	3-point field goal percentage	FT%	Free throw percentage
RPG	Rebounds per game	APG	Assists per game	SPG	Steals per game
BPG	Blocks per game	PPG	Points per game	**Bold**	Career high

=== NBA ===
==== Regular season ====
Year	Team	GP	GS	MPG	FG%	3P%	FT%	RPG	APG	SPG	BPG	PPG
1976–77	Philadelphia	32	0	5.4	.340		**.889**	1.2	.6	.2	.1	2.6
1977–78	Cleveland	53		15.6	.433		**.889**	2.0	1.4	.4	.3	8.9
1978–79	Cleveland	49		22.7	**.483**		.824	2.0	2.1	.8	.3	13.3
1978–79	Atlanta	29	0	19.9	.481		.857	2.4	2.8	.6	**.4**	9.9
1979–80	Atlanta	21		19.2	.410	.111	.863	2.0	3.4	.9	**.4**	8.4
1979–80	Utah	**55**		**31.2**	.476	**.315**	.876	**2.8**	**4.0**	**1.0**	.3	**16.0**
Career		239	0	20.1	.459	.293	.862	2.1	2.4	.7	.3	10.7

==== Playoffs ====
Year	Team	GP	MPG	FG%	FT%	RPG	APG	SPG	BPG	PPG
1977	Philadelphia	5	3.2	**.545**	**1.000**	1.0	.0	.2	.0	3.2
1978	Cleveland	2	25.0	.481	**1.000**	2.5	2.5	.0	.0	**16.0**
1979	Atlanta	**9**	**27.1**	.487	.929	**3.6**	**3.2**	**.8**	**.2**	15.1
Career		16	19.4	.490	.947	2.6	2.1	.5	.1	11.5

== See also ==
- List of basketball players who died during their careers
