= 1975–76 Michigan State Spartans men's basketball team =

American college basketball season

1975–76 Michigan State Spartans men's basketball
- Conference: Big Ten Conference
- Record: 14–13 (10–8 Big Ten)
- Head coach: Gus Ganakas (7th season)
- Assistant coaches: Dick Versace; Pat Miller; Vernon Payne
- Captain: Terry Furlow
- Home arena: Jenison Fieldhouse

1975–76 Big Ten Conference men's basketball standings
	Conf.				Overall
Team	W		L	PCT	W		L	PCT
No. 1 Indiana	18	–	0	1.000	32	–	0	1.000
No. 9 Michigan	14	–	4	.778	25	–	7	.781
Purdue	11	–	7	.611	16	–	11	.593
Michigan State	10	–	8	.556	14	–	13	.519
Iowa	9	–	9	.500	19	–	10	.655
Minnesota	8	–	10	.444	16	–	10	.615
Illinois	7	–	11	.389	14	–	13	.519
Northwestern	7	–	11	.389	12	–	15	.444
Wisconsin	4	–	14	.222	10	–	16	.385
Ohio State	2	–	16	.111	6	–	20	.231
Rankings from AP Poll

The 1975–76 Michigan State Spartans men's basketball team represented Michigan State University in the 1975–76 NCAA Division I men's basketball season as members of the Big Ten Conference. They played their home games at Jenison Fieldhouse in East Lansing, Michigan and were coached by Gus Ganakas in his seventh and final year as head coach of the Spartans. MSU finished the season 14–13, 10–8 in Big Ten play to finish in fourth place.

Ganakas was fired as head coach after the season due, in part to the walk-out of black players in 1975 and as part of an athletic department purge. Ganakas would continue as an assistant athletic director for MSU until 1998.

== Previous season ==
The Spartans finished the 1974–75 season 17–9, 10–8 in Big Ten play to finish in fifth place.

== Roster and statistics ==
1975–76 Michigan State Spartans men's basketball team
No	Name	Pos	Year	Height	Pts	Reb	Ast
12	Milt Wiley	G	FR	5–11	1.6	0.3	1.0
15	Kevin Vandenbussche	G	JR	6–4	0.2	0.2	0.4
21	Paul Stoll	G	JR	6–2	0.0	0.0	0.0
22	Lovelle Rivers	C	SR	6–5	1.3	2.8	0.3
23	Benny White	G	SR	5–9	6.3	1.9	3.9
24	Cedric Milton	C	SR	6–9	6.5	5.3	0.8
25	Terry Furlow	F	SR	6–5	29.4	7.7	3.2
32	Greg Kelser	F	FR	6–6	11.7	9.5	1.2
33	Edgar Wilson	F	JR	6–5	7.7	5.4	1.6
34	Ricky Nash	F	SO	6–4	0.9	1.3	0.1
41	Dan Riewald	F	JR	6–5	1.5	1.2	0.3
42	Tanya Webb	F	FR	6–8	1.5	1.1	0.0
44	Robert Chapman	G	JR	6–2	14.6	3.5	2.0
45	David Jordan	F	SO	6–5			
52	Patrick Holewinski	C	SR	6–10	0.6	0.0	0.3

== Schedule and results ==
Date time, TV	Rank^{#}	Opponent^{#}	Result	Record	Site city, state
Non-conference regular season
Dec 1, 1975*		Central Michigan	W 69–61	1–0	Jenison Fieldhouse; East Lansing, MI
Dec 6, 1975*		at Eastern Michigan	L 79–85	1–1	Bowen Field House; Ypsilanti, MI
Dec 8, 1975*		Canisius	W 83–68	2–1	Jenison Fieldhouse; East Lansing, MI
Dec 13, 1975*		at Western Michigan	L 68–78	2–2	University Arena; Kalamazoo, MI
Dec 20, 1975*		at No. 9 NC State	L 75–84	2–3	Reynolds Coliseum; Raleigh, NC
Dec 22, 1975*		at Detroit Mercy	L 82–85	2–4	Calihan Hall; Detroit, MI
Dec 29, 1975*		vs. Southern Miss; VCU Invitational semifinals	W 89–77	3–4	Franklin Street Gym; Richmond, VA
Dec 30, 1975*		at VCU; VCU Invitational championship	L 75–80	3–5	Franklin Street Gym; Richmond, VA
Big Ten regular season
Jan 3, 1976		at Wisconsin	L 63–70	3–6 (0–1)	Wisconsin Field House; Madison, WI
Jan 5, 1976		Iowa	W 105–88	4–6 (1–1)	Jennison Fieldhouse; East Lansing, MI
Jan 8, 1976		at Northwestern	L 89–105	4–7 (1–2)	Welsh-Ryan Arena; Evanston, IL
Jan 10, 1976		Ohio State	W 92–82	5–7 (2–2)	Jenison Fieldhouse; East Lansing, MI
Jan 12, 1976		No. 1 Indiana	L 57–69	5–8 (2–3)	Jenison Fieldhouse; East Lansing, MI
Jan 17, 1976		at No. 16 Michigan; Rivalry	L 63–66	5–9 (2–4)	Crisler Arena; Ann Arbor, MI
Jan 24, 1976		at Illinois	W 74–63	6–9 (3–4)	Assembly Hall; Champaign, IL
Jan 24, 1976		at Purdue	W 66–65	7–9 (4–4)	Mackey Arena; West Lafayette, IN
Jan 31, 1976		Minnesota	W 75–63	8–9 (5–4)	Jenison Fieldhouse; East Lansing, MI
Feb 2, 1976		Northwestern	W 91–71	9–9 (6–4)	Jenison Fieldhouse; East Lansing, MI
Feb 7, 1976		at Ohio State	W 83–82	10–9 (7–4)	St. John Arena; Columbus, OH
Feb 9, 1976		at No. 1 Indiana	L 70–85	10–10 (7–5)	Assembly Hall; Bloomington, IN
Feb 14, 1976		No. 16 Michigan; Rivalry	L 64–81	10–11 (7–6)	Jenison Fieldhouse; East Lansing, Mi
Feb 21, 1976		Illinois	W 69–59	11–11 (8–6)	Jenison Fieldhouse; East Lansing, MI
Feb 23, 1976		Purdue	W 89–76	12–11 (9–6)	Jenison Fieldhouse; East Lansing, MI
Feb 28, 1976		at Minnesota	L 61–71	12–12 (9–7)	Williams Arena; Minneapolis, MN
Mar 1, 1976		at Iowa	W 93–88	13–12 (10–7)	Iowa Field House; Iowa City, IA
Mar 6, 1976		Wisconsin	L 82–86	13–13 (10–8)	Jenison Fieldhouse; East Lansing, MI
*Non-conference game. ^{#}Rankings from AP Poll. (#) Tournament seedings in parentheses. Source

== Awards and honors ==
- Terry Furlow – All-Big Ten First Team
- Terry Furlow – Big Ten Scoring Champion (31.0 ppg in-conference)
