= 1975–76 Northwestern Wildcats men's basketball team =

American college basketball season

1975–76 Northwestern Wildcats men's basketball
- Conference: Big Ten Conference
- Record: 12–15 (7–11 Big Ten)
- Head coach: Tex Winter (3rd season)
- Home arena: Welsh–Ryan Arena

1975–76 Big Ten Conference men's basketball standings
	Conf.				Overall
Team	W		L	PCT	W		L	PCT
No. 1 Indiana	18	–	0	1.000	32	–	0	1.000
No. 9 Michigan	14	–	4	.778	25	–	7	.781
Purdue	11	–	7	.611	16	–	11	.593
Michigan State	10	–	8	.556	14	–	13	.519
Iowa	9	–	9	.500	19	–	10	.655
Minnesota	8	–	10	.444	16	–	10	.615
Illinois	7	–	11	.389	14	–	13	.519
Northwestern	7	–	11	.389	12	–	15	.444
Wisconsin	4	–	14	.222	10	–	16	.385
Ohio State	2	–	16	.111	6	–	20	.231
Rankings from AP Poll

The 1975–76 Northwestern Wildcats men's basketball team represented Northwestern University during the 1975–76 NCAA Division I men's basketball season.

== Roster ==
1975–76 Northwestern Wildcats men's basketball team
Players
Coaches

Pos.	#	Name	Height	Weight	Year	Hometown
G	15	Tony Allen	6 ft 5 in (1.96 m)	195 lb (88 kg)	So	Chicago, Illinois
F	45	Pete Boesen	6 ft 8 in (2.03 m)	200 lb (91 kg)	Fr	Park Ridge, Illinois
F	24	Randy Carroll	6 ft 5 in (1.96 m)	205 lb (93 kg)	Fr	Atlanta, Georgia
F	31	Brad Cartwright	6 ft 6 in (1.98 m)	195 lb (88 kg)	Jr	Morton Grove, Illinois
G	30	Jim Endsley	6 ft 3 in (1.91 m)	175 lb (79 kg)	Fr	Sheboygan Falls, Wisconsin
G	22	Bill Fenlon	6 ft 3 in (1.91 m)	165 lb (75 kg)	Fr	Atlanta, Georgia
F	54	Dave Fields	6 ft 8 in (2.03 m)	220 lb (100 kg)	Jr	Wyandotte, Michigan
F	10	Hilton Hale	6 ft 4 in (1.93 m)	190 lb (86 kg)	So	Columbus, Ohio
G	25	Bob Hildebrand	6 ft 1 in (1.85 m)	175 lb (79 kg)	Jr	Glen Ellyn, Illinois
F	20	David Hiser	6 ft 6 in (1.98 m)	185 lb (84 kg)	Jr	Bloomington, Illinois
C	53	Bob Klaas	6 ft 9 in (2.06 m)	205 lb (93 kg)	Fr	Palos Heights, Illinois
G	14	Jerry Marifke	6 ft 3 in (1.91 m)	180 lb (82 kg)	Fr	Milwaukee, Wisconsin
G	30	Billy McKinney	6 ft 0 in (1.83 m)	160 lb (73 kg)	Jr	Zion, Illinois
G	42	Dick Milam	6 ft 2 in (1.88 m)	190 lb (86 kg)	Jr	Lebanon, Indiana
F	44	Bob Svete	6 ft 8 in (2.03 m)	195 lb (88 kg)	So	North Chicago, Illinois
G	43	Tim Teasley	6 ft 1 in (1.85 m)	175 lb (79 kg)	Sr	Detroit, Michigan
F	40	Dennis Trompeter	6 ft 5 in (1.96 m)	190 lb (86 kg)	So	Peru, Illinois
C	52	Chris Wall	6 ft 10 in (2.08 m)	225 lb (102 kg)	So	Wilmette, Illinois
C	55	Jim Wallace	6 ft 10 in (2.08 m)	225 lb (102 kg)	Sr	Detroit, Michigan
F	34	Chris Winter	6 ft 5 in (1.96 m)	180 lb (82 kg)	So	Evanston, Illinois

Head coach

- Tex Winter

Assistant coach(es)

Legend

- (C) Team captain
- (S) Suspended
- (I) Ineligible
- (W) Walk-on
- Injured
- Current redshirt

== Schedule ==
Date time, TV	Rank^{#}	Opponent^{#}	Result	Record	Site city, state
November 29*		at Nebraska	L 68–79	0–1	Nebraska Coliseum; Lincoln, Nebraska
December 1*		No. 7 Kentucky	W 89–77	1–1	Welsh–Ryan Arena; Evanston, Illinois
December 6*		Ohio	W 88–62	2–1	Welsh–Ryan Arena; Evanston, Illinois
December 9*		at Valparaiso	W 98–77	3–1	Hilltop Gym; Valparaiso, Indiana
December 18*		DePaul	L 57–65	3–2	Welsh–Ryan Arena; Evanston, Illinois
December 20*		at No. 3 Marquette	L 53–75	3–3	MECCA Arena; Milwaukee, WI
December 26*		vs. Oregon State	W 72–67	4–3	
December 29*		vs. No. 13 Washington	L 57–70	4–4	
December 30*		vs. Duquesne	W 78–71	5–4	
January 3		No. 17 Michigan	L 72–82	5–5 (0–1)	Welsh–Ryan Arena; Evanston, Illinois
January 5		at No. 1 Indiana	L 61–78	5–6 (0–2)	Assembly Hall; Bloomington, Indiana
January 8		Michigan State	W 105–89	6–6 (1–2)	Welsh–Ryan Arena; Evanston, Illinois
January 10		at Illinois	L 55–61	6–7 (1–3)	Assembly Hall; Champaign, Illinois
January 12		at Purdue	L 81–91	6–8 (1–4)	Mackey Arena; West Lafayette, Indiana
January 17		Minnesota	W 85–77	7–8 (2–4)	Welsh–Ryan Arena; Evanston, Illinois
January 19		Iowa	W 99–92	8–8 (3–4)	Welsh–Ryan Arena; Evanston, Illinois
January 24		Wisconsin	W 62–60	9–8 (4–4)	Welsh–Ryan Arena; Evanston, Illinois
January 31		at Ohio State	L 69–83	9–9 (4–5)	St. John Arena; Columbus, Ohio
February 2		at Michigan State	L 71–91	9–10 (4–6)	Jenison Fieldhouse; East Lansing, Michigan
February 7		Illinois	L 55–61	9–11 (4–7)	Welsh–Ryan Arena; Evanston, Illinois
February 9		Purdue	L 58–86	9–12 (4–8)	Welsh–Ryan Arena; Evanston, Illinois
February 14		at Minnesota	W 75–69	10–12 (5–8)	Williams Arena; Minneapolis, Minnesota
February 16		at Iowa	L 68–81	10–13 (5–9)	Iowa Field House; Iowa City, Iowa
February 21		at Wisconsin	W 90–77	11–13 (6–9)	Wisconsin Field House; Madison, Wisconsin
February 28		Ohio State	W 88–78	12–13 (7–9)	Welsh–Ryan Arena; Evanston, Illinois
March 1		No. 1 Indiana	L 63–76	12–14 (7–10)	Welsh–Ryan Arena; Evanston, Illinois
March 6		No. 11 Michigan	L 77–80	12–15 (7–11)	Welsh–Ryan Arena; Evanston, Illinois
*Non-conference game. ^{#}Rankings from AP Poll. (#) Tournament seedings in parentheses.
