= Joe B. Hall =

American basketball coach (1928–2022)

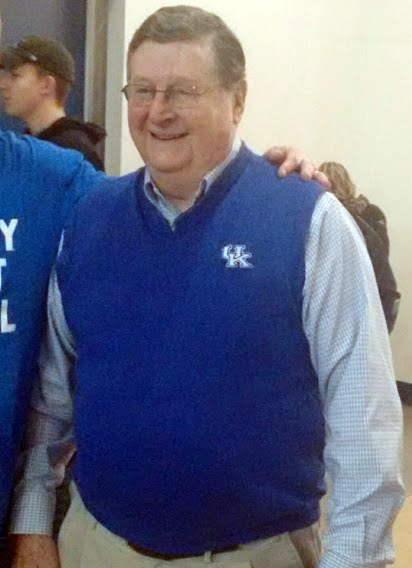
- Hall in 2016

Biographical details
- Born: November 30, 1928; Cynthiana, Kentucky, U.S.
- Died: January 15, 2022 (aged 93); Lexington, Kentucky, U.S.

Playing career
- 1948–1949: Kentucky
- 1949–1951: Sewanee

Coaching career (HC unless noted)
- 1959–1964: Regis
- 1964–1965: Central Missouri
- 1965–1972: Kentucky (assistant)
- 1972–1985: Kentucky

Head coaching record
- Overall: 373–156

Accomplishments and honors

Championships
- NCAA Division I tournament (1978); 3 NCAA Division I Regional—Final Four (1975, 1978, 1984); NIT (1976); MIAA regular season (1965); 8 SEC regular season (1973, 1975, 1977, 1978, 1980, 1982–1984); SEC tournament (1984)

Awards
- National Coach of the Year (1978); 4× SEC Coach of the Year (1973, 1975, 1978, 1983)
- College Basketball Hall of Fame; Inducted in 2012

Joe Beasman Hall (November 30, 1928 – January 15, 2022) was an American college basketball coach. He was the head coach at the University of Kentucky from 1972 to 1985, leading the Wildcats to a national championship in 1978.

== Biography ==
Hall played one year of varsity basketball at Kentucky before transferring to the Sewanee: The University of the South, where he completed his basketball playing eligibility but did not graduate. After Sewanee, Hall toured with the Harlem Globetrotters and later returned to Kentucky to complete his undergraduate studies. Hall graduated from Kentucky in 1955.

Hall previously coached at the Central Missouri State College (now the University of Central Missouri) and Regis University before returning to Kentucky in 1965 to serve as an assistant coach under Adolph Rupp. When Rupp reached mandatory retirement age of 70, Hall was selected as the new coach on April 1, 1972. In his initial statements upon taking the job he made it clear that he would recruit black players to the team (previously there had only been three in the program's history). Hall made further waves by hiring the program's first black assistant coach; Leonard Hamilton would serve as one of Kentucky's main recruiters and would later have great success as a head coach himself.

In the 1978 NCAA tournament, he coached the Wildcats to their fifth NCAA Men's Division I Basketball Championship. He was named National Coach of the Year in 1978 and Southeastern Conference Coach of the Year on four occasions. His record at UK was 297–100, and 373–156 over his career. Along with the 1978 title, Hall also guided Kentucky to a runner-up finish to UCLA in the 1975 NCAA tournament, a Final Four appearance in the 1984 NCAA tournament (losing to eventual champion Georgetown), and an NIT championship in 1976. He won eight Southeastern Conference regular season championships and one Southeastern Conference tournament championship.

On September 18, 2012, the University of Kentucky unveiled a statue of Hall outside of the Wildcat Coal Lodge to commemorate his accomplishments at UK and his contributions toward the Wildcat Coal Lodge. The university said that the bronze sculpture was produced over a period of eight months, beginning as a clay sculpture, then was cast in bronze. It was created by sculptor J. Brett Grill of Columbia, Missouri. Hall co-hosted a radio sports talk show with former University of Louisville basketball head coach Denny Crum from March 2004 to October 2014. The Joe B. and Denny Show ended on October 30, 2014, after WVLK, the Lexington radio station from which Hall did his portion of the show, announced a change in format.

== Personal life and death ==
Hall died at his residence in Lexington, Kentucky, on January 15, 2022, at the age of 93. He was buried at The Lexington Cemetery in Lexington, Kentucky.

== Head coaching record ==
Record table
Season	Team	Overall	Conference	Standing	Postseason
Regis Rangers (Independent) (1959–1964)
1959–60	Regis	10–11			
1960–61	Regis	10–10			
1961–62	Regis	10–11			
1962–63	Regis	15–9			
1963–64	Regis	12–9			
Regis:		57–50			
Central Missouri State Mules (Missouri Intercollegiate Athletic Association) (1964–1965)
1964–65	Central Missouri State	19–6	9–1	T–1st	NCAA College Division Regional Third Place
Central Missouri State:		19–6	9–1		
Kentucky Wildcats (Southeastern Conference) (1972–1985)
1972–73	Kentucky	20–8	14–4	1st	NCAA University Division Elite Eight
1973–74	Kentucky	13–13	9–9	T–4th	
1974–75	Kentucky	26–5	15–3	T–1st	NCAA Division I Runner-up
1975–76	Kentucky	20–10	11–7	T–4th	NIT champion
1976–77	Kentucky	26–4	16–2	T–1st	NCAA Division I Elite Eight
1977–78	Kentucky	30–2	16–2	1st	NCAA Division I champion
1978–79	Kentucky	19–12	10–8	6th	NIT First Round
1979–80	Kentucky	29–6	15–3	1st	NCAA Division I Sweet 16
1980–81	Kentucky	22–6	15–3	2nd	NCAA Division I Second Round
1981–82	Kentucky	22–8	13–5	T–1st	NCAA Division I First Round
1982–83	Kentucky	23–8	13–5	1st	NCAA Division I Elite Eight
1983–84	Kentucky	29–5	14–4	1st	NCAA Division I Final Four
1984–85	Kentucky	18–13	11–7	T–3rd	NCAA Division I Sweet 16
Kentucky:		297–100	172–62		
Total:		373–156			
National champion Postseason invitational champion Conference regular season champion Conference regular season and conference tournament champion Division regular season champion Division regular season and conference tournament champion Conference tournament champion

== See also ==
- List of NCAA Division I Men's Final Four appearances by coach
