= 1976 National Invitation Tournament =

Annual NCAA college basketball competition

- Season: 1975–76
- Teams: 12
- Finals site: Madison Square Garden, New York City
- Champions: Kentucky Wildcats (2nd title)
- Runner-up: Charlotte 49ers (1st title game)
- Semifinalists: NC State Wolfpack (2nd semifinal); Providence Friars (6th semifinal)
- Winning coach: Joe B. Hall (1st title)
- MVP: Cedric Maxwell (Charlotte)

The 1976 National Invitation Tournament was the 1976 edition of the annual NCAA college basketball competition.

== Selected teams ==
Below is a list of the 12 teams selected for the tournament.

- Charlotte
- Holy Cross
- Kansas State
- Kentucky
- Louisville
- Niagara
- North Carolina A&T
- North Carolina State
- Oregon
- Providence
- Saint Peter's
- San Francisco

== Brackets ==
Below is the tournament bracket.

First round
Charlotte	79
San Francisco	74
Holy Cross	84
Saint Peter's	78
Kentucky	67
Niagara	61
Providence	84
North Carolina A&T	68

Quarterfinals
Charlotte	79
Oregon	72
NC State	78
Holy Cross	68
Kentucky	81
Kansas State	78
Louisville	67
Providence	73

Semifinals
Charlotte	80
NC State	79
Kentucky	79
Providence	78

Final
Charlotte	67
Kentucky	71

Third place game
NC State	74
Providence	69

== See also ==
- 1976 NCAA Division I basketball tournament
- 1976 NCAA Division II basketball tournament
- 1976 NCAA Division III basketball tournament
- 1976 NAIA Division I men's basketball tournament
- 1976 National Women's Invitational Tournament
