= Scott May =

American basketball player (born 1954)

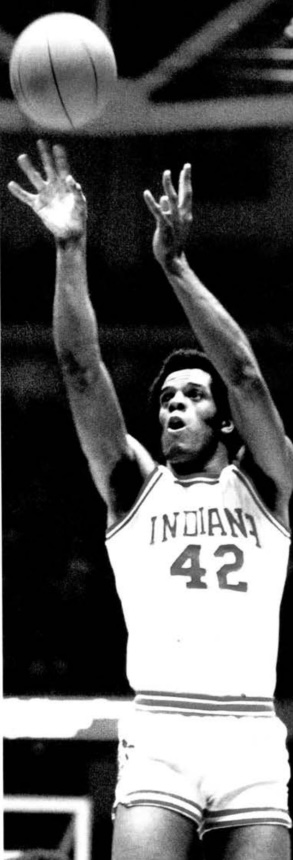
- May in the 1975–76 season at Indiana

Personal information
- Born: March 19, 1954 (age 72) Sandusky, Ohio, U.S.
- Listed height: 6 ft 7 in (2.01 m)
- Listed weight: 215 lb (98 kg)

Career information
- High school: Sandusky (Sandusky, Ohio)
- College: Indiana (1973–1976)
- NBA draft: 1976: 1st round, 2nd overall pick
- Drafted by: Chicago Bulls
- Playing career: 1976–1988
- Position: Small forward
- Number: 17, 42, 7, 24

Career history
- 1976–1981: Chicago Bulls
- 1981–1982: Milwaukee Bucks
- 1982: Detroit Pistons
- 1983: Cidneo Brescia
- 1983–1986: Berloni Torino
- 1986: Virtus Banco di Roma
- 1986–1988: Enichem Livorno

Career highlights
- NBA All-Rookie First Team (1977); NCAA champion (1976); Naismith College Player of the Year (1976); Adolph Rupp Trophy (1976); Helms Foundation Player of the Year (1976); AP College Player of the Year (1976); NABC Player of the Year (1976); UPI College Player of the Year (1976); Sporting News College Player of the Year (1976); 2× Consensus first-team All-American (1975, 1976)

Career NBA statistics
- Points: 3,690 (10.4 ppg)
- Rebounds: 1,450 (4.1 rpg)
- Assists: 610 (1.7 apg)
- Stats at NBA.com
- Stats at Basketball Reference
- Collegiate Basketball Hall of Fame
Medals
Men's basketball
Representing United States
Olympic Games
Gold medal – first place	1976 Montreal	Team competition

Scott Glenn May (born March 19, 1954) is an American former professional basketball player. As a college player at Indiana University, May led the Hoosiers to an undefeated record and national championship in the 1975–76 season. He was a two-time first-team All-American and was named the national player of the year in his senior season. May also won a gold medal at the 1976 Summer Olympics.

== College career ==
Born in Sandusky, Ohio, Scott May played as a 6'7" forward for Bob Knight and the Indiana University Hoosiers from 1973 to 1976. "Our group knew what we wanted. We were going to do whatever it took to win it all."

In his last two seasons with the school, 1974–75 and 1975–76, the Hoosiers were undefeated in the regular season and won 37-consecutive Big Ten games. The 1974–75 Hoosiers swept the entire Big Ten by an average of 22.8 points per game. However, in an 83–82 win against Purdue, May broke his left arm. With May's injury keeping him to 7 minutes of play, the No. 1 Hoosiers lost to Kentucky 92–90 in the Mideast Regional. The Hoosiers were so dominant that four starters – May, Steve Green, Kent Benson and Quinn Buckner – would make the five-man All-Big Ten team. The following season, 1975–76, the Hoosiers went the entire season and 1976 NCAA tournament without a single loss, beating Michigan 86–68 in the title game. Indiana remains the last school to accomplish this feat.

May was the 1975–76 team's leading scorer, "its most dependable clutch scorer, and an outstanding defensive player and rebounder, too."

== Professional career ==
The Chicago Bulls chose May with the second overall pick in the 1976 NBA draft. He made the NBA All-Rookie team after averaging 14.2 points for the Bulls. Injuries kept him to seven seasons in the NBA, scoring 3,690 points and pulling down 1,450 rebounds. He went on to play seven more years in Europe with Brescia, Torino, Rome and Livorno in the Italian league.

== Personal life ==
May had two sons – Scott May Jr. and Sean May – who continued his tradition of basketball play. Scott Jr. played for the Indiana basketball team that made the NCAA title game in 2002. His younger son, Sean, helped North Carolina win a national championship in 2005 and played for the NBA Sacramento Kings and Charlotte Bobcats. May and Sean are one of four father-son duos to each win an NCAA basketball championship. (Note: The others are Marques and Kris Johnson, Henry and Mike Bibby, and Derek and Nolan Smith.)

== Career statistics ==
Legend
GP	Games played	GS	Games started	MPG	Minutes per game
FG%	Field goal percentage	3P%	3-point field goal percentage	FT%	Free throw percentage
RPG	Rebounds per game	APG	Assists per game	SPG	Steals per game
BPG	Blocks per game	PPG	Points per game	**Bold**	Career high

=== NBA ===
==== Regular season ====
Year	Team	GP	GS	MPG	FG%	3P%	FT%	RPG	APG	SPG	BPG	PPG
1976–77	Chicago	**72**	-	**32.9**	.451	-	.828	**6.1**	2.0	**1.1**	**0.2**	**14.6**
1977–78	Chicago	55	-	32.8	.454	-	.810	6.0	**2.1**	0.9	0.1	13.4
1978–79	Chicago	37	-	10.9	.434	-	.750	1.7	1.1	0.6	0.0	4.0
1979–80	Chicago	54	-	24.0	.450	.000	**.837**	4.0	1.9	0.8	0.1	12.4
1980–81	Chicago	63	-	12.9	.488	.000	.758	2.5	1.0	0.6	0.1	7.0
1981–82	Milwaukee	65	**7**	18.3	**.508**	.000	.824	3.4	2.0	0.8	0.1	9.0
1982–83	Detroit	9	1	17.2	.420	.000	.810	2.9	1.3	0.6	**0.2**	6.6
Career		355	8	22.6	.462	.000	.811	4.1	1.7	0.8	0.1	10.4

==== Playoffs ====
Year	Team	GP	GS	MPG	FG%	3P%	FT%	RPG	APG	SPG	BPG	PPG
1976–77	Chicago	3	-	**32.3**	**.385**	-	**.800**	**4.7**	1.0	**2.7**	**0.7**	**10.7**
1981–82	Milwaukee	**4**	-	12.5	.200	.000	.643	2.8	**2.5**	0.5	0.0	4.3
Career		7	-	21.0	.304	.000	.724	3.6	1.9	1.4	0.3	7.0

=== College ===
Year	Team	GP	GS	MPG	FG%	3P%	FT%	RPG	APG	SPG	BPG	PPG
1973–74	Indiana	28	-	-	.492	-	.768	5.4	1.5	-	-	12.5
1974–75	Indiana	30	-	-	.510	-	.766	6.6	1.9	-	-	16.3
1975–76	Indiana	**32**	-	-	**.527**	-	**.782**	**7.7**	**2.1**	-	-	**23.5**
Career		90	-	-	.513	-	.774	6.6	1.8	-	-	17.7

== External links and sources ==
- Scott May statistics
- Scott May Serie A statistics.
