= 1975–76 Michigan Wolverines men's basketball team =

American college basketball season

1975–76 Michigan Wolverines men's basketball

NCAA tournament, runner-up

National Championship Game, L 68-86 vs. Indiana
- Conference: Big Ten Conference

Ranking
- Coaches: No. 9
- AP: No. 9
- Record: 25–7 (14–4 Big Ten)
- Head coach: Johnny Orr
- Assistant coaches: Bill Frieder; Jim Boyce
- MVP: Rickey Green
- Captain: Wayman Britt
- Home arena: Crisler Arena

1975–76 Big Ten Conference men's basketball standings
	Conf.				Overall
Team	W		L	PCT	W		L	PCT
No. 1 Indiana	18	–	0	1.000	32	–	0	1.000
No. 9 Michigan	14	–	4	.778	25	–	7	.781
Purdue	11	–	7	.611	16	–	11	.593
Michigan State	10	–	8	.556	14	–	13	.519
Iowa	9	–	9	.500	19	–	10	.655
Minnesota	8	–	10	.444	16	–	10	.615
Illinois	7	–	11	.389	14	–	13	.519
Northwestern	7	–	11	.389	12	–	15	.444
Wisconsin	4	–	14	.222	10	–	16	.385
Ohio State	2	–	16	.111	6	–	20	.231
Rankings from AP Poll

The 1975–76 Michigan Wolverines men's basketball team represented the University of Michigan in intercollegiate college basketball during the 1975–76 season. The team played its home games in the Crisler Arena in Ann Arbor, Michigan, and was a member of the Big Ten Conference. Under the direction of head coach Johnny Orr, the team finished second in the Big Ten Conference.

The team lost to all four ranked opponents it played during the regular season. However, the team earned the third of four consecutive NCAA Division I men's basketball tournament invitations, and it defeated the first three ranked opponents that it faced in the tournament. Wayman Britt served as team captain, and Rickey Green earned team MVP. As a team, it led the conference in scoring offense with an 85.8 average in conference games as well as in field goal percentage with a 52.1%.

The team began the season ranked sixteenth and peaked at ninth, where it finished the season in the Associated Press Top 20 Poll. It was ranked for a total of 16 out of 17 weeks during the season. The team also ended the season ranked ninth in the final UPI Coaches' Poll.

That season, Hubbard set the current school record for single-season rebounds by a freshman of 352. The team set a new school record by totaling 2753 points over the course of the season. The record would last for eleven seasons. The team set the school single-season total assist record of 600.

On January 12, 1976, the team began a 22-game home winning streak against Ohio State that continued through a November 30, 1977, victory over Eastern Michigan. This surpassed the 17-game streak from December 1, 1964 – January 29, 1966, and stood as the longest home winning streak in school history until a 24-game streak that started on January 5, 1985.

In the 32-team 1976 NCAA Division I men's basketball tournament, Michigan reached the championship game by winning the Midwest region. In so doing they defeated the Wichita State Shockers 74–73, the Notre Dame Fighting Irish 80–76 and the Missouri Tigers 95–88. Then in the final four, the team defeated the previously unbeaten Rutgers Scarlet Knights 86–70 before losing in the championship game to the unbeaten Indiana Hoosiers 86–68.

== Regular season ==
The team set the school record by totaling 2753 points during its 32-game season. The record lasted until 1987. The team also set the school record for field goal percentage (.510, 1138-for-2231), which would last for five seasons.

== Schedule ==
1975-76 Overall: 25-7 Big Ten: 14-4 (2nd) Postseason: NCAA (Midwest) (Final Four; Runner-up) Head Coach: Johnny Orr Staff: Bill Frieder & Jim Boyce Captain: Wayman Britt Home Arena: Crisler Arena (13,609)

Date Rk Opponent H/A W/L Score +/-
12/2/1975 #16 Vanderbilt H W 90-63 +27
12/6/1975 #16 at #9 Tennessee A L 81-82 -1
12/10/1975 #18 South Carolina H W 91-82 +9
12/13/1975 #18 Dayton H W 106-80 +26
12/19/1975 #16 Southern Illinois H1 W 74-49 +25
12/20/1975 #16 Miami (Ohio) H1 W 90-76 +14
12/29/1975 #16 vs. LaSalle N2 W 86-71 +15
12/30/1975 #16 vs. #10 UNLV N2 L 94-108 -14
1/3/1976 #17 at Northwestern+ A W 82-72 +10
1/5/1976 #17 #16 Minnesota+ H W 95-72 +23
1/8/1976 #19 at Wisconsin+ A W 106-81 +25
1/10/1976 #19 #1 Indiana+ H L 74-80 -6
1/12/1976 #19 Ohio State+ H W 84-81 +3
1/17/1976 #16 Michigan State+ H W 66-63 +3
1/24/1976 #17 at Purdue+ A W 84-80 +4
1/26/1976 #17 at Illinois+ A L 75-76 -1
1/31/1976 #15 Iowa+ H W 104-95 +9
2/2/1976 #15 Wisconsin+ H W 107-86 +21
2/7/1976 #16 at #1 Indiana+ (OT) A L 67-72 -5
2/9/1976 #16 at Ohio State+ A W 90-66 +24
2/14/1976 #16 at Michigan State+ A W 81-64 +17
2/16/1976 #16 Eastern Michigan H W 94-76 +18
2/21/1976 #15 Purdue+ H W 92-81 +11
2/23/1976 #15 Illinois+ H W 90-75 +15
2/28/1976 #13 at Iowa+ A W 88-74 +14
3/1/1976 #13 at Minnesota+ A L 79-81 -2
3/6/1976 #11 Northwestern+ H W 80-77 +3
3/13/1976 #14 vs. Wichita State N3 W 74-73 +1
3/18/1976 #9 vs. #7 Notre Dame N4 W 80-76 +4
3/20/1976 #9 vs. #14 Missouri N4 W 95-88 +7
3/27/1976 #9 vs. #4 Rutgers N5 W 86-70 +16
3/29/1976 #9 vs. #1 Indiana N5 L 68-86 -18

(1) Michigan Invitational, Ann Arbor, Mich. (Crisler Arena) (2) Las Vegas Holiday Classic, Las Vegas, Nev. (L.V. Convention Center) (3) NCAA Tournament, Denton, Texas (North Texas Coliseum) (4) NCAA Tournament, Louisville, Ky. (Freedom Hall) (5) NCAA Tournament, Philadelphia, Pa. (The Spectrum)

== Statistics ==
The team posted the following statistics:

Name	GP	GS	Min	Avg	FG	FGA	FG%	3FG	3FGA	3FG%	FT	FTA	FT%	OR	DR	RB	Avg	Ast	Avg	PF	DQ	TO	Stl	Blk	Pts	Avg
Rickey Green	32	32			266	542	0.491	--	--		106	135	0.785		118	119	3.7	132	4.1	88	1				638	19.9
Phil Hubbard	32	31			208	381	0.546	--	--		66	113	0.584	5	347	352	11.0	36	1.1	129	10				482	15.1
John Robinson	32	31			173	302	0.573	--	--		102	123	0.829	7	255	262	8.2	74	2.3	83	1				448	14.0
Wayman Britt	32	32			153	326	0.469	--	--		42	55	0.764	0	135	135	4.2	123	3.8	109	9				348	10.9
Steve Grote	32	29			134	265	0.506	--	--		69	95	0.726	3	93	96	3.0	112	3.5	116	8				337	10.5
Dave Baxter	32	3			80	164	0.488	--	--		46	56	0.821	0	45	45	1.4	62	1.9	54	0				206	6.4
Joel Thompson	28	1			42	86	0.488	--	--		10	17	0.588	0	63	63	2.3	17	0.6	37	0				94	3.4
Alan Hardy	29	0			41	83	0.494	--	--		10	19	0.526	0	44	44	1.5	18	0.6	17	0	24			92	3.2
Tom Bergen	29	0			24	43	0.558	--	--		15	17	0.882	0	35	35	1.2	8	0.3	33	0	3			63	2.2
Tom Staton	22	0			14	52	0.269	--	--		6	10	0.600	0	13	13	0.6	9	0.4	20	0	8			34	1.6
Lloyd Schinnerer	11	1	17	1.6	1	3	0.333	--	--		4	6	0.667	0	4	4	0.4	1	0.1	3	0	5			6	0.6
Bobby Jones	5	0	5	1.0	2	2	1.000	--	--		1	2	0.500	0	0	0	0.0	0	0.0	2	0	0			5	1.0
Len Lillard	5	0	5	1.0	0	0		--	--		0	0		0	3	3	0.6	0	0.0	1	0	0			0	0.0
Donald Johnston	1	0	2	2.0	0	0		--	--		0	0		0	0	0	0.0	0	0.0	0	0	1			0	0.0
TEAM	32														123	123	3.8									
Season Total	32				1138	2249	0.506				477	648	0.736		1278	1294	40.4	592	18.5	692	29				2753	86.0
Opponents	32				1005	2132	0.471	--	--		446	635	0.702		1224	1224	38.3	514	16.1	625	25				2456	76.8

== Rankings ==
Ranking movements Legend: ██ Increase in ranking ██ Decrease in ranking
	Week																
Poll	Pre	1	2	3	4	5	6	7	8	9	10	11	12	13	14	15	Final
AP Poll	16	16	18	16	16	17	19	16	17	15		16	15	13	11	14	9

== NCAA tournament ==
- Midwest
  - Michigan 74, Wichita State 73
  - Michigan 80, Notre Dame 76
  - Michigan 95, Missouri 88
- Final Four
  - Michigan 86, Rutgers 70
  - Indiana 86, Michigan 68

== Team players drafted into the NBA ==
Seven players from this team were selected in the NBA draft.

Year	Round	Pick	Overall	Player	NBA Club
1976	4	9	60	Wayman Britt	Los Angeles Lakers
1977	1	16	16	Rickey Green	Golden State Warriors
1977	3	11	55	Steve Grote	Cleveland Cavaliers
1977	5	22	110	John Robinson	Los Angeles Lakers
1978	3	17	61	Dave Baxter	Seattle SuperSonics
1978	4	3	69	Joel Thompson	Houston Rockets
1979	1	15	15	Phil Hubbard	Detroit Pistons
