= Wayne Radford (basketball) =

American basketball player (1956–2021)

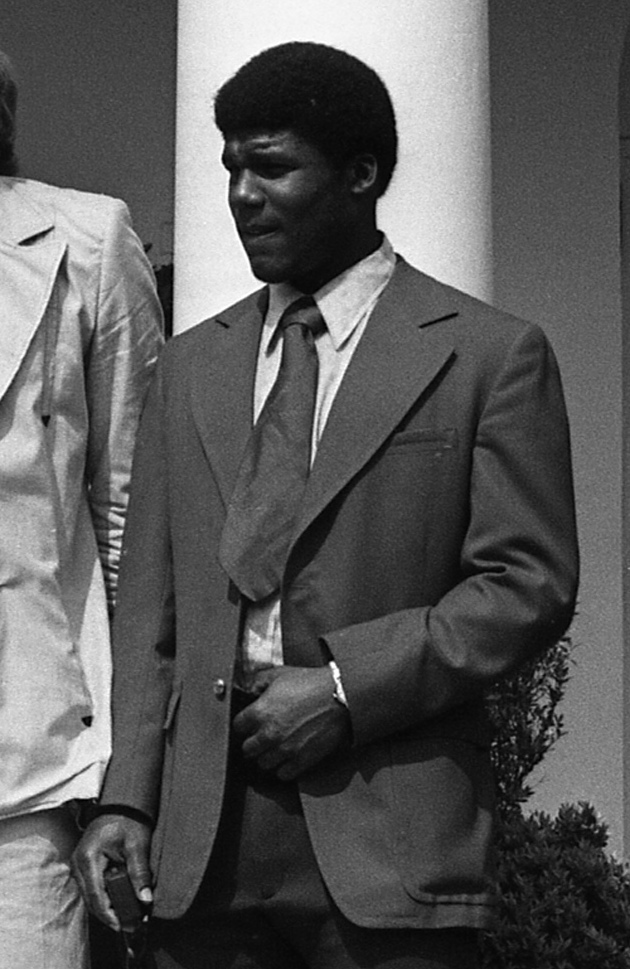
- Radford in 1976

Personal information
- Born: May 29, 1956 Indianapolis, Indiana, U.S.
- Died: January 10, 2021 (aged 64) Indianapolis, Indiana, U.S.
- Listed height: 6 ft 3 in (1.91 m)
- Listed weight: 205 lb (93 kg)

Career information
- High school: Arlington (Indianapolis, Indiana)
- College: Indiana (1974–1978)
- NBA draft: 1978: 2nd round, 27th overall pick
- Drafted by: Indiana Pacers
- Playing career: 1978–1979
- Position: Point guard / shooting guard
- Number: 21

Career history
- 1978–1979: Indiana Pacers

Career highlights
- NCAA champion (1976)
- Stats at NBA.com
- Stats at Basketball Reference

Wayne Radford (May 29, 1956 – January 10, 2021) was an American professional basketball player for the Indiana Pacers of the National Basketball Association (NBA). At 6'3" and 205 pounds, he played the guard position.

Born in Indianapolis, Indiana, Radford was a three-year letterman at Arlington High School and a 1974 Indiana All Star. He attended Indiana University Bloomington during the 1970s and earned business degree from Kelley School of Business in 1978. He played for the Hoosiers' undefeated 1975–76 national championship team.

Radford was selected by the Indiana Pacers in the second round of the 1978 NBA draft. He played 52 games for the Pacers during the 1978-79 NBA season, averaging 3.9 points, 1.1 assists, and 1.3 rebounds.

Radford died January 10, 2021, at age 64.

== Career statistics ==
Legend
GP	Games played	GS	Games started	MPG	Minutes per game
FG%	Field goal percentage	3P%	3-point field goal percentage	FT%	Free throw percentage
RPG	Rebounds per game	APG	Assists per game	SPG	Steals per game
BPG	Blocks per game	PPG	Points per game	**Bold**	Career high

=== NBA ===
==== Regular season ====
Year	Team	GP	GS	MPG	FG%	FT%	RPG	APG	SPG	BPG	PPG
1978–79	Indiana	52	2	12.5	.474	.800	1.3	1.1	.6	.0	3.9
