= 1975–76 Wisconsin Badgers men's basketball team =

American college basketball season

1975–76 Wisconsin Badgers men's basketball
- Conference: Big Ten Conference
- Record: 10–16 (4–14 Big Ten)
- Head coach: John Powless (8th season)
- Home arena: UW Fieldhouse

1975–76 Big Ten Conference men's basketball standings
	Conf.				Overall
Team	W		L	PCT	W		L	PCT
No. 1 Indiana	18	–	0	1.000	32	–	0	1.000
No. 9 Michigan	14	–	4	.778	25	–	7	.781
Purdue	11	–	7	.611	16	–	11	.593
Michigan State	10	–	8	.556	14	–	13	.519
Iowa	9	–	9	.500	19	–	10	.655
Minnesota	8	–	10	.444	16	–	10	.615
Illinois	7	–	11	.389	14	–	13	.519
Northwestern	7	–	11	.389	12	–	15	.444
Wisconsin	4	–	14	.222	10	–	16	.385
Ohio State	2	–	16	.111	6	–	20	.231
Rankings from AP Poll

The 1975–76 Wisconsin Badgers men's basketball team represented University of Wisconsin–Madison. The head coach was John Powless, coaching his eighth season with the Badgers. The team played their home games at the UW Fieldhouse in Madison, Wisconsin and was a member of the Big Ten Conference.

== Roster ==
1975–76 Wisconsin Badgers men's basketball team
Players
Coaches

Pos.	#	Name	Height	Weight	Year	Hometown
G	33	Dean Anderson	6 ft 2 in (1.88 m)	175 lb (79 kg)	So	Madison, Wisconsin
F	42	Peter Brey	6 ft 7 in (2.01 m)	215 lb (98 kg)	Jr	Wisconsin Rapids, Wisconsin
F	44	Dale Koehler	6 ft 8 in (2.03 m)	225 lb (102 kg)	Sr	Kewaunee, Wisconsin
C	50	Bob Johnson	6 ft 8 in (2.03 m)	230 lb (104 kg)	Sr	Miami, Oklahoma
G	15	Tim Paterick	6 ft 4 in (1.93 m)	205 lb (93 kg)	Sr	Janesville, Wisconsin
F	32	Rick Piacenza	6 ft 6 in (1.98 m)	205 lb (93 kg)	Sr	Highland Park, Illinois
G	12	Bill Smith	6 ft 2 in (1.88 m)	170 lb (77 kg)	Jr	Fond du Lac, Wisconsin
G	13	James Smith	6 ft 2 in (1.88 m)	165 lb (75 kg)	Jr	Wauwatosa, Wisconsin

Head coach

- John Powless

Assistant coach(es)

Legend

- (C) Team captain
- (S) Suspended
- (I) Ineligible
- (W) Walk-on
- Injured
- Current redshirt

== Schedule ==
Date time, TV	Rank^{#}	Opponent^{#}	Result	Record	Site city, state
Non-conference regular season
Nov 29, 1975*		DePauw	W 105–63	1–0	UW Fieldhouse; Madison, Wisconsin
Dec 3, 1975*		North Dakota State	W 87–79	2–0	UW Fieldhouse; Madison, Wisconsin
Dec 6, 1975*		Loyola (IL)	W 88–73	3–0	UW Fieldhouse; Madison, Wisconsin
Dec 8, 1975*		Northern Illinois	W 97–77	4–0	UW Fieldhouse; Madison, Wisconsin
Dec 13, 1975*		Northern Michigan	W 92–59	5–0	UW Fieldhouse; Madison, Wisconsin
Dec 16, 1975*		at No. 7 Marquette	L 54–78	5–1	MECCA Arena; Milwaukee, Wisconsin
Dec 29, 1975*		vs. Stanford; Milwaukee Classic	W 70–64	6–1	MECCA Arena; Milwaukee, Wisconsin
Dec 30, 1975*		at No. 4 Marquette; Milwaukee Classic	L 66–82	6–2	MECCA Arena; Milwaukee, Wisconsin
Big Ten regular season
Jan 3, 1976		Michigan State	W 70–63	7–2 (1–0)	UW Fieldhouse; Madison, Wisconsin
Jan 5, 1976		Ohio State	W 82–81 ^{OT}	8–2 (2–0)	UW Fieldhouse; Madison, Wisconsin
Jan 8, 1976		No. 16 Michigan	L 81–106	8–3 (2–1)	UW Fieldhouse; Madison, Wisconsin
Jan 10, 1976		at Purdue	L 72–87	8–4 (2–2)	Mackey Arena; West Lafayette, Indiana
Jan 12, 1976		at Illinois	L 81–106	8–5 (2–3)	Assembly Hall (6,968); Champaign, Illinois
Jan 17, 1976		Iowa	L 71–81	8–6 (2–4)	UW Fieldhouse; Madison, Wisconsin
Jan 19, 1976		Minnesota	L 84–96	8–7 (2–5)	UW Fieldhouse; Madison, Wisconsin
Jan 24, 1976		at Northwestern	L 60–62	8–8 (2–6)	Welsh-Ryan Arena; Evanston, Illinois
Jan 31, 1976		at No. 1 Indiana	L 61–114	8–9 (2–7)	Assembly Hall; Bloomington, Indiana
Feb 2, 1976		at No. 16 Michigan	L 86–107	8–10 (2–8)	Crisler Arena; Ann Arbor, Michigan
Feb 7, 1976		Purdue	L 74–85	8–11 (2–9)	UW Fieldhouse; Madison, Wisconsin
Feb 9, 1976		Illinois	L 59–70	8–12 (2–10)	UW Fieldhouse (3,883); Madison, Wisconsin
Feb 14, 1976		at Iowa	L 82–96	8–13 (2–11)	Iowa Field House; Iowa City, Iowa
Feb 16, 1976		at Minnesota	L 74–98	8–14 (2–12)	Williams Arena; Minneapolis, Minnesota
Feb 21, 1976		Northwestern	L 77–90	8–15 (2–13)	UW Fieldhouse; Madison, Wisconsin
Feb 26, 1976		No. 1 Indiana	L 67–96	8–16 (2–14)	UW Fieldhouse; Madison, Wisconsin
Mar 1, 1976		at Ohio State	W 91–79	9–16 (3–14)	St. John Arena; Columbus, Ohio
Mar 6, 1976		at Michigan State	W 86–82	10–16 (4–14)	Jenison Fieldhouse; East Lansing, Michigan
*Non-conference game. ^{#}Rankings from AP Poll. (#) Tournament seedings in parentheses. All times are in Eastern Time.
