= 1975–76 Purdue Boilermakers men's basketball team =

American college basketball season

1975–76 Purdue Boilermakers men's basketball
- Conference: Big Ten
- Record: 16–11 (11–7 Big Ten)
- Head coach: Fred Schaus (4th season)
- Captains: Mike Steele; Gerald Thomas
- Home arena: Mackey Arena

1975–76 Big Ten Conference men's basketball standings
	Conf.				Overall
Team	W		L	PCT	W		L	PCT
No. 1 Indiana	18	–	0	1.000	32	–	0	1.000
No. 9 Michigan	14	–	4	.778	25	–	7	.781
Purdue	11	–	7	.611	16	–	11	.593
Michigan State	10	–	8	.556	14	–	13	.519
Iowa	9	–	9	.500	19	–	10	.655
Minnesota	8	–	10	.444	16	–	10	.615
Illinois	7	–	11	.389	14	–	13	.519
Northwestern	7	–	11	.389	12	–	15	.444
Wisconsin	4	–	14	.222	10	–	16	.385
Ohio State	2	–	16	.111	6	–	20	.231
Rankings from AP Poll

The 1975–76 Purdue Boilermakers men's basketball team represented Purdue University during the 1975-76 college basketball season.

== Schedule ==
Date time, TV	Rank^{#}	Opponent^{#}	Result	Record	Site city, state
November 19*		Athletes in Action; Exhibition	W 99–80		Mackey Arena; West Lafayette, IN
November 29*		Xavier	W 81–64	1-0	Mackey Arena; West Lafayette, IN
December 4*		Rutgers	L 73–81	1-1	Mackey Arena; West Lafayette, IN
December 6*		West Virginia	W 90–79	2-1	WVU Coliseum; Morgantown, WV
December 10*		San Diego State	L 79–81	2-2	Mackey Arena; West Lafayette, IN
December 13*		vs. Providence	L 59–66	2-3	Indianapolis, IN
December 22*		California	W 97–79	3-3	Mackey Arena; West Lafayette, IN
December 29*		vs. Saint Louis; Bruin Classic	W 80–77	4-3	Pauley Pavilion; Los Angeles, CA
December 30*		at No. 4 UCLA; Bruin Classic	L 86–99	4-4	Pauley Pavilion; Los Angeles, CA
January 3		at No. 16 Minnesota	W 111–110 ^{2OT}	5-4 (1-0)	Williams Arena; Minneapolis, MN
January 5*		at Butler	W 81–57	6-4	Hinkle Fieldhouse; Indianapolis, IN
January 10		Wisconsin	W 87–72	7-4 (2-0)	Mackey Arena; West Lafayette, IN
January 12		Northwestern	W 91–81	8-4 (3-0)	Mackey Arena; West Lafayette, IN
January 17		at Ohio State	W 84–80	9-4 (4-0)	St. John Arena; Columbus, OH
January 19		No. 1 Indiana; Indiana–Purdue rivalry	L 67–71	9-5 (4-1)	Assembly Hall; Bloomington, IN
January 24		No. 17 Michigan	L 80–84	9-6 (4-2)	Mackey Arena; West Lafayette, IN
January 26		Michigan State	L 65–66	9-7 (4-3)	Mackey Arena; West Lafayette, IN
January 31		at Illinois	L 63–71	9-8 (4-4)	Assembly Hall; Champaign, IL
February 2		Iowa	W 91–76	10-8 (5-4)	Mackey Arena; West Lafayette, IN
February 7		at Wisconsin	W 85–74	11-8 (6-4)	Wisconsin Field House; Madison, WI
February 9		at Northwestern	W 86–58	12-8 (7-4)	Welsh–Ryan Arena; Evanston, IL
February 14		Ohio State	W 98–73	13-8 (8-4)	Mackey Arena; West Lafayette, IN
February 16		No. 1 Indiana; Indiana-Purdue rivalry	L 71–74	13-9 (8-5)	Mackey Arena; West Lafayette, IN
February 21		at No. 15 Michigan	L 81–92	13-10 (8-6)	Crisler Arena; Ann Arbor, MI
February 23		at Michigan State	L 76–89	13-11 (8-7)	Jenison Fieldhouse; East Lansing, MI
February 28		Illinois	W 81–62	14-11 (9-7)	Mackey Arena; West Lafayette, IN
March 3		at Iowa	W 94–78	15-11 (10-7)	Iowa Field House; Iowa City, IA
March 6		Minnesota	W 94–87 ^{OT}	16-11 (11-7)	Mackey Arena; West Lafayette, IN
*Non-conference game. ^{#}Rankings from AP Poll. (#) Tournament seedings in parentheses.

== Personnel ==
- Starting Lineup: F Jordan, F Walls, C Scheffler, G Parker, G Macy
