= Gus Ganakas =

American basketball coach and broadcaster (1926–2019)

Biographical details
- Born: July 3, 1926; Mount Morris, New York, U.S.
- Died: January 11, 2019 (aged 92); Lansing, Michigan, U.S.

Coaching career (HC unless noted)
- 1969–1976: Michigan State

Head coaching record
- Overall: 89–84

Augustus George Ganakas (July 3, 1926 – January 11, 2019) was an American sports broadcaster, athletics administrator, and coach of the Michigan State Spartans men's basketball team.

== Early life ==
Ganakas was born on July 3, 1926, in Mount Morris, New York, to Greek immigrant parents. He served in World War II in the United States Marine Corps, including service at the Battle of Okinawa, and attended Michigan State University on a G.I. Bill scholarship.

== Career ==
Ganakas taught and coached basketball at East Lansing High School, where he won the 1958 State of Michigan High School Championship, posting an undefeated season. In 1964 he became the Coordinator of the Ralph Young Fund, MSU's athletic fund-raising organization. A passion for sports led him back to the world of basketball when Coach John Benington hired him as his MSU assistant basketball coach in 1966. Three years later, with the sudden death of Coach Benington, Ganakas became the head basketball coach for the Spartans, from 1969 to 1976, compiling an 89–84 (.514) record over 7 seasons.

Controversially, a number of black players walked out on coach Ganakas before a key Big Ten game on January 4, 1975, against Indiana. Ganakas elected to start Jeff Tropf, who was white, 10 black players, led by captain Lindsay Hairston, walked out of the team meeting, returned for the game but were then suspended by Ganakas. Michigan State lost the game 107-55 with a patchwork roster that included junior varsity players. Tropf led the team with 21 points. The players would meet with Ganakas the next day, were reinstated after apologizing, and then defeated Ohio State 88-84 the next day. Tropf would transfer to Central Michigan at the end of the season.

Ganakas was dismissed after the conclusion of the next season on March 16, 1976, but stayed with Michigan State as an Assistant Athletic Director through 1998 and then as an advisor to Spartan Head Coach Tom Izzo through 2000. Ganakas also spent his post-coaching years as a radio analyst on the Spartan Sports Network. He was an active member of the Detroit Sports Broadcasters Association.

Despite being replaced as head coach, Ganakas displayed remarkable character and selflessness. Rather than harboring resentment or seeking to undermine his successor, he actively supported the transition and ensured the continuity of the program's success. About Ganakas, Izzo said, “You’ll learn all you need to about Gus when you look at the way he handled being replaced as head coach. Most of us would have wanted our replacement to fail, hoping it would make us look good. But that wasn’t who Gus was. Instead, he made sure that the local high school superstar Earvin Johnson knew that Michigan State was still the right place for him to attend and that new coach Jud Heathcote was the right guy to play for. As they say, the rest is history. But there is no doubt that Spartan Basketball wouldn’t be what it is today without Gus Ganakas.”

In 2002, Ganakas became the sixth recipient of the Men's Basketball Distinguished Alumnus Award. The Michigan State team MVP award is named in his honor.

== Personal life and death ==
Ganakas was married to his wife Ruth who died in 2014, and was survived by his children Gail, Gary, Greg, Anne, Amy and Marcy. He died on January 11, 2019.

== Head coaching record ==
=== College ===
Record table
Season	Team	Overall	Conference	Standing	Postseason
Michigan State Spartans (Big Ten Conference) (1969–1976)
1969–70	Michigan State	9–15	5–9	T–6th	
1970–71	Michigan State	10–14	4–10	T–7th	
1971–72	Michigan State	13–11	6–8	T–5th	
1972–73	Michigan State	13–11	6–8	T–6th	
1973–74	Michigan State	13–11	8–6	T–4th	
1974–75	Michigan State	17–9	10–8	5th	
1975–76	Michigan State	14–13	10–8	4th	
Michigan State:		89–84	49–57		
Total:		89–84			
