= 1975–76 Iowa Hawkeyes men's basketball team =

American college basketball season

1975–76 Iowa Hawkeyes men's basketball
- Conference: Big Ten Conference
- Record: 19–10 (9-9 Big Ten)
- Head coach: Lute Olson (2nd season)
- Assistant coach: Jim Rosborough
- MVP: Scott Thompson
- Home arena: Iowa Field House (Capacity: 13,365)

1975–76 Big Ten Conference men's basketball standings
	Conf.				Overall
Team	W		L	PCT	W		L	PCT
No. 1 Indiana	18	–	0	1.000	32	–	0	1.000
No. 9 Michigan	14	–	4	.778	25	–	7	.781
Purdue	11	–	7	.611	16	–	11	.593
Michigan State	10	–	8	.556	14	–	13	.519
Iowa	9	–	9	.500	19	–	10	.655
Minnesota	8	–	10	.444	16	–	10	.615
Illinois	7	–	11	.389	14	–	13	.519
Northwestern	7	–	11	.389	12	–	15	.444
Wisconsin	4	–	14	.222	10	–	16	.385
Ohio State	2	–	16	.111	6	–	20	.231
Rankings from AP Poll

The 1975–76 Iowa Hawkeyes men's basketball team represented the University of Iowa as members of the Big Ten Conference. The team was led by head coach Lute Olson, coaching in his 2nd season at the school, and played their home games at the Iowa Field House. They finished the season 19–10 overall and 9–9 in Big Ten play.

== Roster ==
1975–76 Iowa Hawkeyes men's basketball team
Players
Coaches

Pos.	#	Name	Height	Weight	Year	Hometown
G	3	Kirk Speraw	6 ft 0 in (1.83 m)	—	Fr	Sioux City, Iowa
G	10	Cal Wulfsberg	6 ft 3 in (1.91 m)	—	Jr
G	20	Dick Peth	6 ft 2 in (1.88 m)	—	Fr	Tomah, Wisconsin
F	24	William Mayfield	6 ft 7 in (2.01 m)	205 lb (93 kg)	Fr	Detroit, Michigan
F	30	Dan Frost	6 ft 7 in (2.01 m)	—	Sr	Long Beach, California
G	34	Scott Thompson	6 ft 3 in (1.91 m)	—	Sr	Moline, Illinois
G		Archie Mays	—	—	Sr	Dayton, Ohio
F	44	Clay Hargrave	6 ft 4 in (1.93 m)	—	Fr	Iowa City, Iowa
C	50	Mike Gatens	6 ft 9 in (2.06 m)	—	Sr
F/C	54	Bruce "Sky" King	6 ft 8 in (2.03 m)	—	Jr	Dayton, Ohio

Head coach

Lute Olson

Assistant coach(es)

- Jim Rosborough

Legend

- (C) Team captain
- (S) Suspended
- (I) Ineligible
- (W) Walk-on
- Injured
- Current redshirt

== Schedule/results ==
Date time, TV	Rank^{#}	Opponent^{#}	Result	Record	Site city, state
Non-conference regular season
11/29/1975*		Augustana (SD)	W 111-81	1-0	Iowa Field House (8,400); Iowa City, IA
12/3/1975*		Nebraska; Rivalry	W 72-65	2-0	Iowa Field House; Iowa City, IA
12/6/1975*		Northeast Louisiana	W 97-87	3-0	Iowa Field House (10,800); Iowa City, IA
12/8/1975*		at Bradley	W 100-96	4-0	Robertson Memorial Field House; Peoria, IL
12/12/1975*		at Iowa State; Rivalry	W 91-77	5-0	Hilton Coliseum; Ames, IA
12/20/1975*		U.S. International	W 67-52	6-0	Iowa Field House; Iowa City, IA
12/23/1975*		Drake	W 77-73	7-0	Iowa Field House; Iowa City, IA
12/27/1975*		vs. Holy Cross; Rainbow Classic	W 98-75	8-0	Honolulu International Center; Honolulu, HI
12/29/1975*		vs. Arizona; Rainbow Classic	W 82-80	9-0	Honolulu International Center; Honolulu, HI
12/30/1975*		vs. USC; Rainbow Classic	L 73-81	9-1	Honolulu International Center; Honolulu, HI
Big Ten Conference Season
1/3/1976		at Illinois	W 84-60	10-1 (1-0)	Iowa Field House; Iowa City, IA
1/5/1976		at Michigan State	L 88-105	10-2 (1-1)	Jenison Fieldhouse; East Lansing, MI
1/10/1976		at No. 17 Minnesota	W 71-68	11-2 (2-1)	Williams Arena (13,364); Minneapolis, MN
1/17/1976		at Wisconsin	W 81-71	12-2 (3-1)	Wisconsin Field House; Madison, WI
1/19/1976		at Northwestern	L 92-99 ^{OT}	12-3 (3-2)	Welsh-Ryan Arena; Evanston, IL
1/24/1976		Ohio State	W 78-67	13-3 (4-2)	Iowa Field House; Iowa City, IA
1/26/1976		No. 1 Indiana	L 73-88	13-4 (4-3)	Iowa Field House (13,395); Iowa City, IA
1/31/1976		at No. 15 Michigan	L 95-104	13-5 (4-4)	Crisler Arena; Ann Arbor, MI
2/2/1976		at Purdue	L 76-91	13-6 (4-5)	Mackey Arena; West Lafayette, IN
2/7/1976		Minnesota	W 65-58	14-6 (5-5)	Iowa Field House; Iowa City, IA
2/10/1976*		at Drake	W 71-65	15-6 (5-5)	Veterans Memorial Auditorium (11,850); Des Moines, IA
2/14/1976		Wisconsin	W 96-82	16-6 (6-5)	Iowa Field House; Iowa City, IA
2/16/1976		Northwestern	W 81-68	17-6 (7-5)	Iowa Field House (10,561); Iowa City, IA
2/21/1976		at Ohio State	W 69-66	18-6 (8-5)	St. John Arena; Columbus, OH
2/23/1976		at No. 1 Indiana	L 81-101	18-7 (8-6)	Assembly Hall (17,691); Bloomington, IN
2/28/1976		No. 13 Michigan	L 74-88	18-8 (8-7)	Iowa Field House (13,276); Iowa City, IA
3/1/1976		Michigan State	L 88-93	18-9 (8-8)	Iowa Field House; Iowa City, IA
3/3/1976		Purdue	L 78-94	18-10 (8-9)	Iowa Field House; Iowa City, IA
3/6/1976		at Illinois	W 82-70	19-10 (9-9)	Assembly Hall; Champaign, IL
*Non-conference game. ^{#}Rankings from AP Poll. (#) Tournament seedings in parentheses.
