= Mike Griffin (basketball) =

American basketball player and coach

Biographical details
- Born: September 29, 1943 (age 83)

Playing career
- 1963–1965: Columbia

Coaching career (HC unless noted)
- 1967–1970: Columbia (assistant)
- 1970–1973: RPI (assistant)
- 1973–1974: Columbia (freshmen)
- 1974–1975: Vermont (assistant)
- 1976–1982: Colgate
- 1983–1984: Thiel
- 1984–2014: RPI
- 1994–1995: RPI (women's)
- 2014–2015: Hoosac School

Head coaching record
- Overall: 442–492 (men's college); 14–11 (women's college)

Mike Griffin (born September 29, 1943) is a former American college basketball coach, known for his 30-year tenure at Rensselaer Polytechnic Institute (RPI), as well as being the head coach at Division I Colgate from 1976 to 1982.

== Playing career ==
Griffin lettered at Columbia from 1963 to 1965 under Jack Rohan. In his senior season, he averaged 8.8 points per game and 12 rebounds per game, finishing second in the Ivy League in rebounding behind Bill Bradley.

== Coaching career ==
After two years at Temple Law School, Griffin returned to his alma mater to begin his coaching career as an assistant for the Lions from 1967 to 1970. Griffin was on staff for Columbia's 1968 Ivy League Championship squad in which the team earned a berth in the 1968 NCAA tournament, the last time the Lions have been to the NCAAs.

In 1970, Griffin accepted an assistant coaching position at RPI, where he was also the school's junior varsity coach. He returned to Columbia for one season to coach the Lions' freshman basketball team before accepting a position at Vermont under fellow Columbia alum Peter Salzberg for the 1974–75 season.

Griffin accepted his first head coaching job as the men's basketball coach at Colgate in 1976 where in six years, he amassed a 61–94 record. During his tenure, Griffin coached 1981 NBA draft pick and ECAC North Player of the Year, Mike Ferrara.

Taking a year off after leaving Colgate, Griffin spent one season as the head men's basketball coach at Thiel College, before returning to RPI as the head men's basketball coach, a position he would hold until 2014. Overall, including one season as the head women's basketball coach for the Engineers, Griffin compiled a 402–382 record, and earned three trips to the Division III NCAA Tournament.

Griffin would spend one season as the head boys basketball coach at the Hoosac School from 2014 to 2015 before stepping aside due to health issues.

== Head coaching record ==
=== Men's college ===
Record table
Season	Team	Overall	Conference	Standing	Postseason
Colgate (Independent/ECAC North) (1976–1982)
1976–77	Colgate	13–11	N/A	N/A	
1977–78	Colgate	9–17	N/A	N/A	
1978–79	Colgate	12–14	N/A	N/A	
1979–80	Colgate	8–17	N/A	9th	
1980–81	Colgate	11–18	N/A	8th	
1981–82	Colgate	8–17	2–6	7th	
Colgate:		61–94 (.394)	2–6 (.250)		
Total:		442–491 (.474)			
