= ECAC/MSG Holiday Festival =

MSG Holiday Festival

The ECAC and, later, MSG Holiday Festival, held at Madison Square Garden, was a college basketball event held each year during the nonconference portion of the season. It is one of the earliest events of its kind.

In its later years, the Festival used a showcase format with no championship awarded.

Season	Winner
1952–53	Utah State
1953–54	Duquesne
1954–55	Duquesne
1955–56	San Francisco
1956–57	Manhattan
1957–58	Temple
1958–59	St. John's
1959–60	Cincinnati
1960–61	Ohio State
1961–62	Cincinnati
1962–63	Illinois
1963–64	Villanova
1964-65	St. John's
1965–66	Providence
1966–67	Providence
1967–68	Columbia
1968–69	UCLA
1969–70	St. Bonaventure
1970–71	South Carolina
1971–72	Louisville
1972–73	St. John's
1973–74	Manhattan
1974–75	Fordham
1975–76	Indiana
1976–77	Purdue
1977–78	Georgetown
1978–79	Rutgers
1979–80	St. John's
1980–81	North Carolina State
1981–82	St. John's
1982–83	St. John's
1983–84	North Carolina
1984–85	St. John's
1985–86	St. John's
1986–87	St. John's
1987–88	St. John's
1988–89	Ohio State
1989–90	North Carolina State
1990–91	Maryland
1991–92	St. John's
1992–93	Kentucky
1993–94	Georgia Tech
1994–95	Penn
1995–96	Kentucky
1996–97	St. John's
1997–98	Princeton
1998–99	Hofstra
1999–00	Hofstra
2000–01	Penn State
2001–02	Manhattan
2002–03	Manhattan
2003–04	Penn
2004–05	St. John's
2005–06	St. John's
2006–07	Hofstra
2007–08	Virginia Tech
2008–09	Virginia Tech
2009–10	Cornell
2010–11	St. John's
2011–12	Showcase Format
2013–14	Showcase Format
2014–15	Showcase Format
2015–16	Showcase Format
2016–17	Showcase Format
2017–18	Showcase Format
2018–19	Showcase Format
2019–20	Showcase Format
2023–24	Showcase Format
