= 1975–76 Illinois Fighting Illini men's basketball team =

American college basketball season

1975–76 Illinois Fighting Illini men's basketball
- Conference: Big Ten Conference
- Record: 14–13 (7–11 Big Ten)
- Head coach: Lou Henson (1st season)
- Assistant coaches: Tony Yates (2nd season); Mark Coomes (1st season); Les Wothke (1st season)
- MVP: Nate Williams
- Captain: Selected Each Game
- Home arena: Assembly Hall

1975–76 Big Ten Conference men's basketball standings
	Conf.				Overall
Team	W		L	PCT	W		L	PCT
No. 1 Indiana	18	–	0	1.000	32	–	0	1.000
No. 9 Michigan	14	–	4	.778	25	–	7	.781
Purdue	11	–	7	.611	16	–	11	.593
Michigan State	10	–	8	.556	14	–	13	.519
Iowa	9	–	9	.500	19	–	10	.655
Minnesota	8	–	10	.444	16	–	10	.615
Illinois	7	–	11	.389	14	–	13	.519
Northwestern	7	–	11	.389	12	–	15	.444
Wisconsin	4	–	14	.222	10	–	16	.385
Ohio State	2	–	16	.111	6	–	20	.231
Rankings from AP Poll

The 1975–76 Illinois Fighting Illini men's basketball team represented the University of Illinois.

== Regular season ==
During the 1975-76 season, Illinois finished seventh in the Big Ten going went 14-13 overall. Lou Henson took over the team as head coach, replacing Gene Bartow after Bartow left Illinois to replace John Wooden at UCLA.

=== Roster ===
1975–76 Illinois Fighting Illini men's basketball team
Players
Coaches

Pos.	#	Name	Height	Weight	Year	Previous school	Hometown
G	10	Nate Williams	6 ft 4 in (1.93 m)	185 lb (84 kg)	Sr	Crane High School	Chicago, Illinois
F	12	Ken Ferdinand	6 ft 6 in (1.98 m)	200 lb (91 kg)	Fr	Urbana High School	Urbana, Illinois
G	20	Dennis Graff	6 ft 1 in (1.85 m)	170 lb (77 kg)	Sr	Gibson City High School	Gibson City, Illinois
G	23	Larry Lubin	6 ft 0 in (1.83 m)	175 lb (79 kg)	Fr	New Trier High School	Glencoe, Illinois
F	24	Tom Gerhardt	6 ft 5 in (1.96 m)	210 lb (95 kg)	So	De La Salle High School	Chicago, Illinois
G	33	Otho Tucker	6 ft 6 in (1.98 m)	200 lb (91 kg)	RS Sr	Paris High School	Paris, Illinois
G/F	34	Rick Leighty	6 ft 3 in (1.91 m)	180 lb (82 kg)	So	Lawrenceville High School	Lawrenceville, Illinois
F	40	Rich Adams	6 ft 8 in (2.03 m)	200 lb (91 kg)	So	Colerain High School	Cincinnati, Ohio
G/F	42	Tim Bushell	6 ft 6 in (1.98 m)	195 lb (88 kg)	Jr	Lincoln Community High School	Lincoln, Illinois
G/F	44	Audie Matthews	6 ft 5 in (1.96 m)	180 lb (82 kg)	So	Bloom High School	Chicago Heights, Illinois
C	53	Bill Rucks	7 ft 0 in (2.13 m)	250 lb (113 kg)	Sr	Waukegan High School	Waukegan, Illinois
C	54	Mike Washington	6 ft 8 in (2.03 m)	195 lb (88 kg)	So	Morgan Park High School	Chicago, Illinois

Head coach

- Lou Henson (New Mexico State University) (1st year)

Assistant coach(es)

- Tony Yates (University of Cincinnati) (2nd year)
- Les Wothke (Greenville University) (1st year)

Legend

- (C) Team captain
- (S) Suspended
- (I) Ineligible
- (W) Walk-on
- Injured
- Current redshirt

Roster

== Schedule ==
Date time, TV	Rank^{#}	Opponent^{#}	Result	Record	Site (attendance) city, state
Non-Conference regular season
11/28/1975*		at Nebraska	W 60-58	1 - 0	Nebraska Coliseum (6,235); Lincoln, NE
12/1/1975*		Kent State	W 73-54	2 - 0	Assembly Hall (5,007); Champaign, IL
12/4/1975*		Missouri-Rolla	W 67-65	3 - 0	Assembly Hall (5,050); Champaign, IL
12/6/1975*		New Mexico	W 67-66 ^{OT}	4 - 0	Assembly Hall (5,684); Champaign, IL
12/8/1976*		North Dakota State	W 90-73	5 - 0	Assembly Hall (3,016); Champaign, IL
12/11/1975*		at Furman	L 73-75	5 - 1	Greenville, South Carolina (2,579); Greenville, SC
12/13/1975*		at Southern California	L 58-62	5 - 2	Los Angeles Memorial Sports Arena (4,458); Los Angeles, CA
12/20/1975*		Arizona	W 66-60	6 - 2	Assembly Hall (6,115); Champaign, IL
12/22/1975*		Rice	W 106-64	7 - 2	Assembly Hall (6,192); Champaign, IL
Big Ten regular season
1/3/1976		at Iowa; Rivalry	L 60-84	7 - 3 (0 - 1)	Iowa Field House (13,171); Iowa City, IA
1/8/1976		at No. 17 Minnesota	L 68-77	7 - 4 (0 - 2)	Williams Arena (10,062); Minneapolis, MN
1/10/1976		Northwestern; Rivalry	W 74-69	8 - 4 (1 - 2)	Assembly Hall (5,547); Champaign, IL
1/12/1976		Wisconsin	W 71-61	9 - 4 (2 - 2)	Assembly Hall (6,968); Champaign, IL
1/17/1976		No. 1 Indiana; Rivalry	L 55-83	9 - 5 (2 - 3)	Assembly Hall (16,128); Champaign, IL
1/19/1976		at Ohio State	L 63-64	9 - 6 (2 - 4)	St. John Arena (5,715); Columbus, OH
1/24/1976		Michigan State	L 63-74	9 - 7 (2 - 5)	Assembly Hall (6,975); Champaign, IL
1/26/1976		No. 17 Michigan	W 76-75	10 - 7 (3 - 5)	Assembly Hall (5,863); Champaign, IL
1/31/1976		Purdue	W 71-63	11 - 7 (4 - 5)	Assembly Hall (8,467); Champaign, IL
2/2/1976		Minnesota	L 62-72	11 - 8 (4 - 6)	Assembly Hall (7,317); Champaign, IL
2/7/1976		at Northwestern; Rivalry	W 61-55	12 - 8 (5 - 6)	McGaw Memorial Hall (4,228); Evanston, IL
2/9/1976		at Wisconsin	W 70-59	13 - 8 (6 - 6)	Wisconsin Field House (3,883); Madison, WI
2/14/1976		at No. 1 Indiana; Rivalry	L 48-58	13 - 9 (6 - 7)	Assembly Hall (17,759); Bloomington, IN
2/16/1976		Ohio State	W 91-73	14 - 9 (7 - 7)	Assembly Hall (8,087); Champaign, IL
2/21/1976		at Michigan State	L 59-69	14 - 10 (7 - 8)	Jenison Fieldhouse (4,227); East Lansing, MI
2/23/1976		at No. 15 Michigan	L 75-90	14 - 11 (7 - 9)	Crisler Center (8,121); Ann Arbor, MI
2/28/1976		at Purdue	L 62-81	14 - 12 (7 - 10)	Mackey Arena (13,729); West Lafayette, IN
3/6/1976		Iowa; Rivalry	L 70-82	14 - 13 (7 - 11)	Assembly Hall (10,028); Champaign, IL
*Non-conference game. ^{#}Rankings from AP Poll. (#) Tournament seedings in parentheses. All times are in Central Time.

== Player stats ==
Player	Games played	Field goals	Free throws	Rebounds	Assists	Points
Rich Adams	27	181	67	158	41	429
Audi Matthews	27	129	46	144	50	304
Mike Washington	27	105	40	142	78	250
Nate Williams	18	102	39	63	44	243
Otho Tucker	26	83	68	135	84	234
Ken Ferdinand	26	72	17	83	11	161
Rick Leighty	27	50	10	70	53	110
Larry Lubin	26	22	16	19	46	60
Tom Gearhardt	22	15	8	34	12	38
Dennis Graff	15	4	16	4	6	24
Tim Bushell	8	2	2	3	2	6

== Awards and honors ==
- Nate Williams
  - Team Most Valuable Player

== Team players drafted into the NBA ==
Player	NBA club	Round	Pick
Nate Williams	Chicago Bulls	5	69
Otho Tucker	Boston Celtics	10	169
