= Kent Benson =

American basketball player (born 1954)

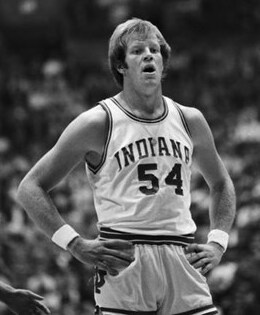
- Benson in 1976

Personal information
- Born: December 27, 1954 (age 71) New Castle, Indiana, U.S.
- Listed height: 6 ft 11 in (2.11 m)
- Listed weight: 235 lb (107 kg)

Career information
- High school: Chrysler (New Castle, Indiana)
- College: Indiana (1973–1977)
- NBA draft: 1977: 1st round, 1st overall pick
- Drafted by: Milwaukee Bucks
- Playing career: 1977–1989
- Position: Center
- Number: 54

Career history
- 1977–1980: Milwaukee Bucks
- 1980–1986: Detroit Pistons
- 1986–1987: Utah Jazz
- 1987–1988: Cleveland Cavaliers
- 1988–1989: Vismara Cantù

Career highlights
- NCAA champion (1976); NCAA Final Four Most Outstanding Player (1976); Helms Foundation Player of the Year (1976); 2× Consensus first-team All-American (1976, 1977); Third-team Parade All-American (1973); Indiana Mr. Basketball (1973)

Career NBA statistics
- Points: 6,168 (9.1 ppg)
- Rebounds: 3,881 (5.7 rpg)
- Assists: 1,203 (1.8 apg)
- Stats at NBA.com
- Stats at Basketball Reference

Michael Kent Benson (born December 27, 1954) is an American former professional basketball player. He was a two-time All-American for the Indiana Hoosiers, winning the 1976 Helms Foundation Player of the Year and helping lead the Hoosiers to the 1976 NCAA championship with a perfect 32–0 record, with Benson being named the 1976 NCAA Final Four Most Outstanding Player. Benson was the No. 1 overall pick of the 1977 NBA draft by the Milwaukee Bucks, playing 11 seasons in the NBA for Milwaukee (1977–1980), the Detroit Pistons (1980–1986), Utah Jazz (1986–1987) and Cleveland Cavaliers (1988).

== High school career ==
Kent Benson attended New Castle Chrysler High School, located in New Castle, Indiana. He was named "Indiana Mr. Basketball" in 1973. He scored 1,496 points and had 1,585 rebounds in three varsity seasons playing for coach Cecil Tague.

== College career ==
Benson chose to attend Indiana University, located in Bloomington, Indiana, playing college basketball for Coach Bobby Knight. As a freshman, Benson averaged 9.3 points per game, while shooting 50.4 percent. He helped lead Indiana to the CCAT Championship, and to a 23–5 record and a Big Ten title.

In his sophomore season (1974–1975), Benson helped lead the Hoosiers to an undefeated conference record (18–0) and on to an Elite Eight appearance, where they lost their only game of the season to Kentucky 92–90, despite 33 points and 23 rebounds from Benson. Helping lead the team to a 31–1 record on the season, Benson averaged 15 points and 8.9 rebounds a game.

With seniors Quinn Buckner and Scott May, he helped lead Indiana to the 1976 national championship in a 1975–1976 season where the Hoosiers won every game they played, finishing 32–0. Benson was voted the 1976 NCAA basketball tournament Most Outstanding Player. The 1976 Indiana team is the most recent team to complete an undefeated campaign in Division I. Benson averaged 17.3 points and 8.8 rebounds a game on the season with his college season high of 57.8 percent from the field. He scored his career high of 38 points against Michigan State.

In the 1976 NCAA tournament, Benson scored 20 points with 13 rebounds against St. John's in the 90–70 regional quarterfinal win; He scored 15 points and had five rebounds in the 74–69 sweet sixteen win over Alabama; In the Regional Final, he scored 18 points with 9 rebounds in the 65–56 win over Marquette; In the Final Four semi-final 65–51 victory against UCLA, Benson had 16 points and 9 rebounds; In the National Championship, he scored 25 points with 9 rebounds in the Hoosiers' 86–68 victory over Michigan.

Of the undefeated 1975–76 Indiana Hoosiers men's basketball team, Benson said, “If the team wins, everybody wins. Coach Knight knew the potential that could be with that team. He molded us and made us a team.”

After the perfect season during his junior year, "Benny" became the lone star for Indiana after May and Buckner both left after their senior years for the next level. He averaged 19.8 points and 10.4 rebounds a game his senior season. He led them to a 16–11 record, but Indiana received no post season appearance. Benson was named the Big Ten's 1977 Player of the Year, while also receiving All-American honors for the second straight season.

Kent Benson ended his college career with 1,740 points (15.3) and 1,031 (9.0) rebounds, a 71.5% free throw and 53.6% field goal percentage.

== Professional career ==
After graduating from Indiana University in 1977, Benson was the number one overall draft pick of the 1977 NBA draft by the Milwaukee Bucks.

Two minutes into his very first game as a professional, Benson elbowed Los Angeles Lakers center Kareem Abdul-Jabbar in the abdomen, and Abdul-Jabbar gave Benson a concussion with a retaliatory punch. Abdul-Jabbar broke his hand in the incident and was out for two months; otherwise, he could have potentially been suspended by the NBA. Meanwhile, Benson missed only one contest and was back in action four days later against Chicago, playing 24 minutes. On April 6, 1979, Benson scored a career high 28 points, grabbed 10 rebounds, recorded 5 assists, blocked 3 shots, and stole the ball 3 times while helping lead the Bucks to a 140–131 victory over the Utah Jazz.

Benson spent 11 seasons in the NBA with Milwaukee (1977–1980), Detroit (1980–1986), Utah (1986–1987) and Cleveland (1988). He averaged 9.1 points and 5.7 rebounds in 680 regular season games. He wore jersey #54 for his entire career.

Benson never lived up to the potential of a number one NBA draft pick. Twice in his career, he was traded for a future Hall of Fame player.

In 1980, the Bucks traded him to the Detroit Pistons for Bob Lanier, who would help the Bucks to consecutive Eastern Conference finals appearances in 1983 and 1984.

In 1986, the Pistons traded him along with Kelly Tripucka to the Utah Jazz for Adrian Dantley, who would help lead the Pistons to the Eastern Conference finals in 1987 and the NBA Finals in 1988.

Benson played in Italy following his two-game tenure with Cleveland in 1988. He played one year in Italy before retiring. “I had prepared myself [to leave the sport,]" he said. “I had an opportunity to stay and play in Italy for five more years. I actually walked away with two years left to go on my contract and just felt it was time to move on. Basketball was good to me and I was good to it, but I was ready to move on.”

== NBA career statistics ==
Legend
GP	Games played	GS	Games started	MPG	Minutes per game
FG%	Field goal percentage	3P%	3-point field goal percentage	FT%	Free throw percentage
RPG	Rebounds per game	APG	Assists per game	SPG	Steals per game
BPG	Blocks per game	PPG	Points per game	**Bold**	Career high

=== Regular season ===
Year	Team	GP	GS	MPG	FG%	3P%	FT%	RPG	APG	SPG	BPG	PPG
1977–78	Milwaukee	69		18.7	.465	.000	.652	4.3	1.4	1.0	0.8	7.7
1978–79	Milwaukee	**82**		26.0	.518	.000	.735	7.1	2.5	1.1	1.0	12.3
1979–80	Milwaukee	56		24.8	.494	.000	.680	5.9	2.3	1.0	**1.3**	8.8
1979–80	Detroit	17		29.5	.460	.250	.750	7.1	3.0	1.1	1.1	12.1
1980–81	Detroit	59		**33.2**	.473	.000	.772	6.8	**2.9**	**1.2**	1.1	**15.7**
1981–82	Detroit	75	**72**	32.9	.505	.273	.804	**8.7**	2.1	0.9	**1.3**	12.5
1982–83	Detroit	21	15	28.5	.467	.000	.760	7.4	2.3	0.7	0.8	9.9
1983–84	Detroit	**82**	58	21.1	.550	.000	**.822**	5.0	1.6	0.9	0.6	7.1
1984–85	Detroit	72	35	19.5	.506	.000	.809	4.5	1.3	0.7	0.6	6.6
1985–86	Detroit	72	51	18.7	.484	**.500**	.795	5.2	1.1	0.8	0.7	6.5
1986–87	Utah	73	2	12.3	.443	.286	.810	3.2	0.5	0.5	0.4	4.5
1987–88	Cleveland	2	0	6.0	**1.000**	.000	.500	0.5	0.0	0.5	0.5	2.5
Career		680	233	23.1	.493	.206	.757	5.7	1.8	0.9	0.9	9.1

=== Playoffs ===
Year	Team	GP	GS	MPG	FG%	3P%	FT%	RPG	APG	SPG	BPG	PPG
1977–78	Milwaukee	**9**		11.4	.478	.000	.545	1.7	0.3	0.6	0.3	3.1
1983–84	Detroit	5		**25.8**	.432	.000	.600	**6.0**	**1.4**	**1.0**	**1.4**	**7.6**
1984–85	Detroit	**9**	**1**	15.8	**.543**	.000	**.867**	4.0	0.4	0.9	0.2	7.0
1985–86	Detroit	4	0	13.8	.400	.000	.000	3.3	0.0	0.0	0.5	2.0
1986–87	Utah	2	0	1.5	.000	.000	.000	0.0	0.0	0.0	0.0	0.0
Career		29	1	14.9	.483	.000	.694	3.2	0.5	0.6	0.5	4.7

== Personal life ==
After the NBA, Benson worked for Kruse International, doing car auction commentary and The College Network, after working in life insurance and estate planning for 14 years.

Benson has four daughters, Andrea, Ashley, Elizabeth and Gennie. Ashley played volleyball at Indiana University, where she was an All-American. She then became an assistant volleyball coach. Gennie played volleyball at Vincennes University.

== Honors and awards ==
- Benson was inducted into the Indiana Basketball Hall of Fame in 1999.
- The Indiana University Athletics Hall of Fame inducted Benson as a member in 1989.
- Benson was voted the 1976 NCAA basketball tournament Most Outstanding Player.
- Benson was named "Indiana Mr. Basketball" in 1973.
- A portion of Ross Street in New Castle, Indiana was renamed in honor of Benson in 2023.
- J. Walter Kennedy Citizenship Award: 1982
