= Wayman Britt =

American basketball player

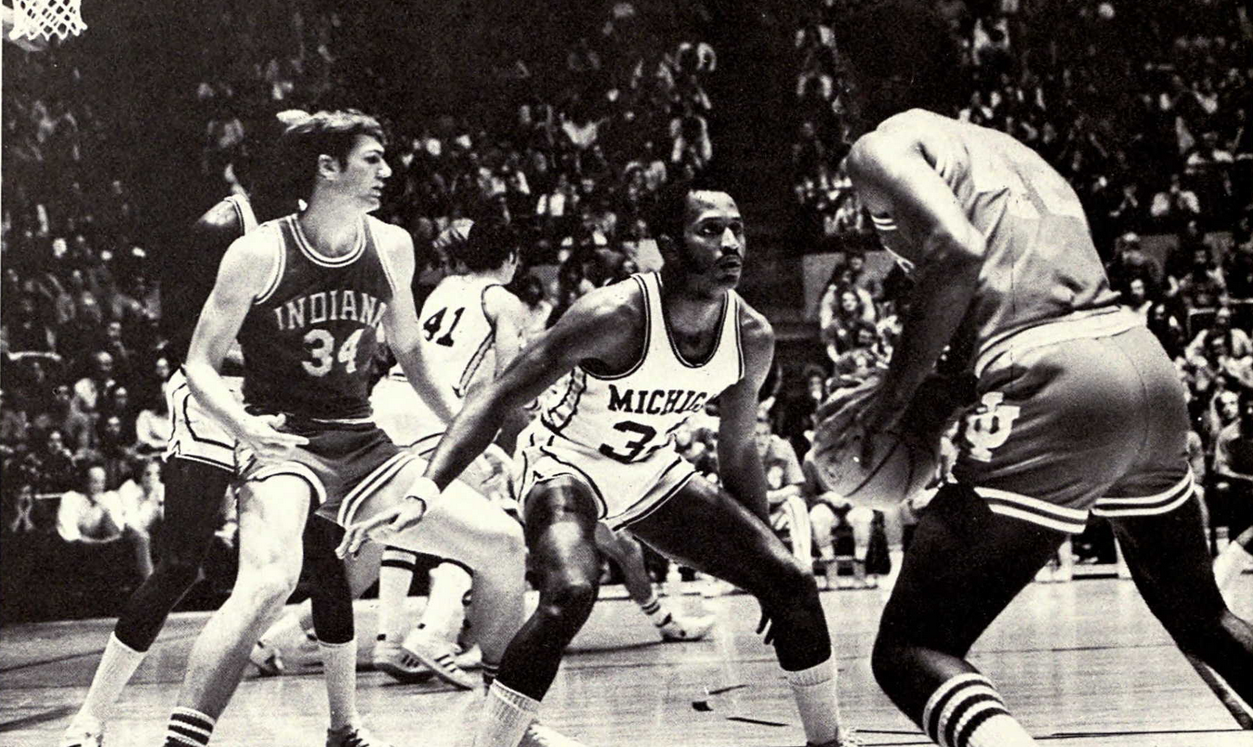
- Britt from 1975 Michiganensian

Personal information
- Born: August 31, 1954 (age 72) Wilson's Mills, North Carolina, U.S.
- Listed height: 6 ft 2 in (1.88 m)
- Listed weight: 185 lb (84 kg)

Career information
- High school: Flint Northern (Flint, Michigan)
- College: Michigan (1972–1976)
- NBA draft: 1976: 4th round, 60th overall pick
- Drafted by: Los Angeles Lakers
- Playing career: 1976–1977
- Position: Guard
- Number: 12

Career history
- 1976–1977: Detroit Pistons
- Stats at NBA.com
- Stats at Basketball Reference

Wayman P. Britt (born August 31, 1954) is a retired American basketball player.

Born in Wilson's Mills, North Carolina, his family moved to Flint, Michigan, where he helped Flint Northern High School win two consecutive Class A state basketball championships in 1971 and 1972. He played collegiately for the University of Michigan, where he received a Bachelor of Arts in communication. The university's annual award for the "Outstanding Defensive Player" is named for Britt.

Britt was selected by the Los Angeles Lakers in the fourth round (60th pick overall) of the 1976 NBA draft.

He played for the Detroit Pistons (1977–78) in the NBA for seven games.

Britt also was drafted in the 13th round (364th overall) of the 1976 NFL draft by the Washington Redskins.

Following his NBA career, Britt held various management positions at Steelcase and Michigan National Bank – Central, before joining the government of Kent County, Michigan, the fourth largest county in Michigan, as Deputy County Administrator.

In 2018, Britt was named Kent County Administrator, overseeing the daily activities of the county and serving as the county's Chief Administrative and Financial Officer.

== Career statistics ==
Legend
GP	Games played	GS	Games started	MPG	Minutes per game
FG%	Field goal percentage	3P%	3-point field goal percentage	FT%	Free throw percentage
RPG	Rebounds per game	APG	Assists per game	SPG	Steals per game
BPG	Blocks per game	PPG	Points per game	**Bold**	Career high

=== NBA ===
==== Regular season ====
Year	Team	GP	MPG	FG%	FT%	RPG	APG	SPG	BPG	PPG
1977–78	Detroit	7	2.3	.300	.750	.6	.3	.1	.0	1.3
