= 1975–76 Kentucky Wildcats men's basketball team =

1975–76 season of University of Kentucky men's basketball team

1975–76 Kentucky Wildcats men's basketball

1976 National Invitation Tournament, Champion
- Conference: Southeast Conference

Ranking
- Coaches: No. Not ranked
- AP: No. Not ranked
- Record: 20–10 (11–7 SEC)
- Head coach: Joe B. Hall (4th season)
- Assistant coaches: Dick Parsons; Leonard Hamilton; Lynn Nance
- Home arena: Memorial Coliseum

1975–76 Southeastern Conference men's basketball standings
	Conf.				Overall
Team	W		L	PCT	W		L	PCT
No. 6 Alabama	15	–	3	.833	23	–	5	.821
No. 13 Tennessee	14	–	4	.778	21	–	6	.778
Vanderbilt	12	–	6	.667	16	–	11	.593
Kentucky	11	–	7	.611	20	–	10	.667
Auburn	11	–	7	.611	16	–	10	.615
Florida	7	–	11	.389	12	–	14	.462
Georgia	7	–	11	.389	12	–	15	.444
Mississippi State	6	–	12	.333	13	–	13	.500
LSU	5	–	13	.278	12	–	14	.462
Ole Miss	2	–	16	.111	6	–	21	.222
Rankings from AP Poll

The 1975–76 Kentucky Wildcats men's basketball team represented University of Kentucky. The head coach was Joe B. Hall. The team was a member of the Southeast Conference and played their home games at Memorial Coliseum. Kentucky finished with an overall record of 20–10 (11–7 SEC). The Wildcats were invited to the 1976 National Invitation Tournament and won in the final 71–67 over the Charlotte 49ers.

== National Invitation Tournament ==
- First Round
  - Kentucky 67, Niagara 61
- Second Round
  - Kentucky 81, Kansas State 78
- Semifinal
  - Kentucky 79, Providence 78
- Final
  - Kentucky 71, Charlotte 67

== Team players drafted into the NBA ==
No one from the Wildcats was selected in the 1976 NBA draft.
