= On the Mindless Menace of Violence =

1968 speech by U.S. senator Robert F. Kennedy

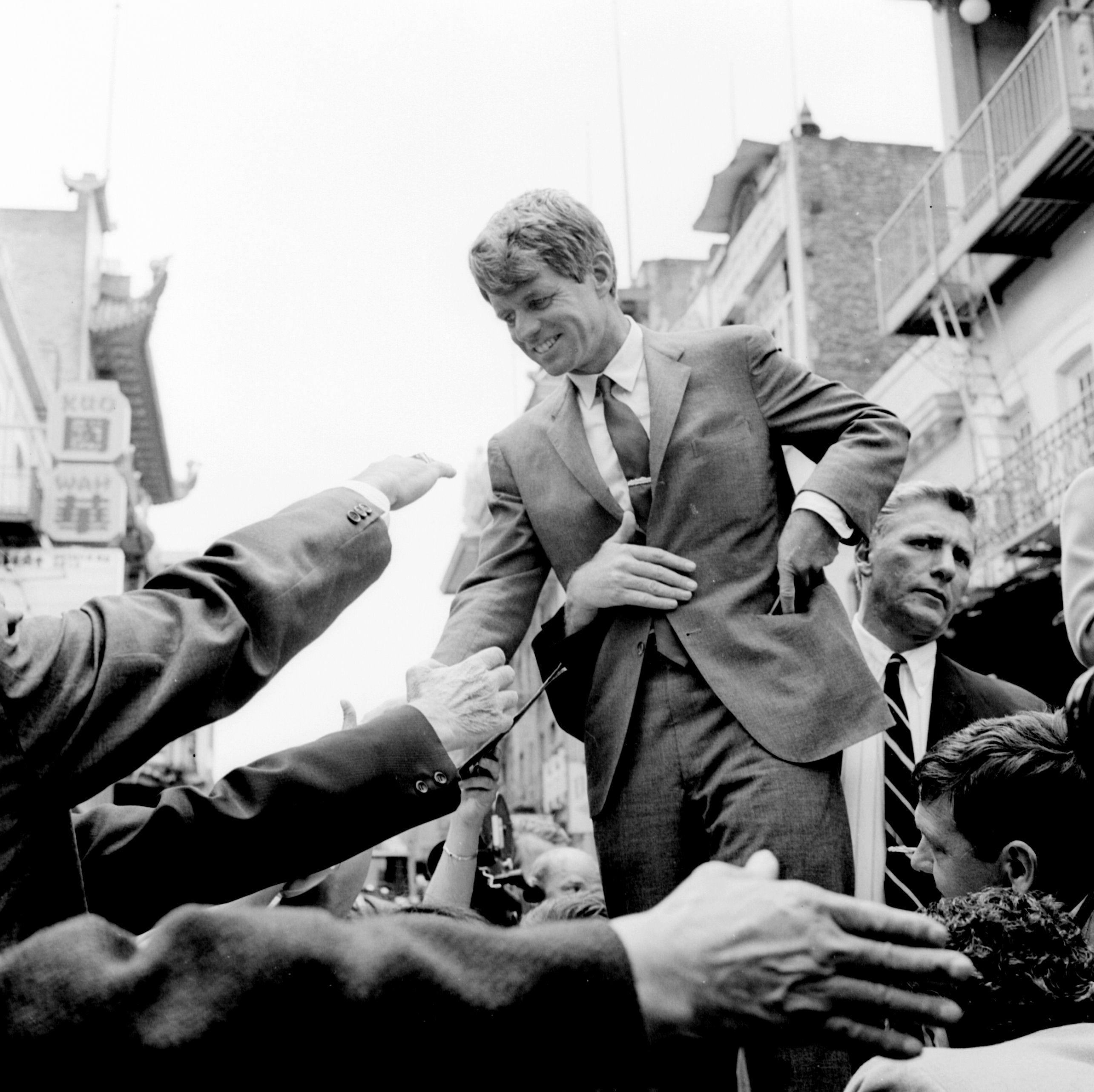
Senator Robert F. Kennedy, campaigning for president in 1968

"On the Mindless Menace of Violence" (Note: The speech is also simply listed as "The Mindless Menace of Violence" or called "A Time of Shame and Sorrow".) is a speech given by United States senator and presidential candidate Robert F. Kennedy. He delivered it in front of the City Club of Cleveland at the Sheraton-Cleveland Hotel on April 5, 1968, the day after the assassination of Martin Luther King Jr. With the speech, Kennedy sought to counter the King-related riots and disorder emerging in various cities, and address what he viewed as the growing problem of violence in American society.

On April 4, King, a prominent African-American civil rights leader, was assassinated. Race riots subsequently broke out across the United States. After delivering an improvised speech on the matter in Indianapolis, Kennedy withdrew to the hotel he was staying in and suspended his presidential campaign. Community leaders convinced him to keep a single engagement before the City Club of Cleveland. Doing away with his prepared remarks, Kennedy's speechwriters worked early into the morning of April 5 to craft a response to the assassination. Kennedy reviewed and revised the draft en route to Cleveland. Speaking for only ten minutes, Kennedy outlined his view on violence in American society before a crowd of 2,200. He criticized both the rioters and the white establishment who, from his perspective, were responsible for the deterioration of social conditions in the United States. He proposed no specific solutions to the internal division and conflict, but urged the audience to seek common ground and try to cooperate with other Americans.

Kennedy's speech received much less attention than his famous remarks in Indianapolis and was largely forgotten by the news media and scholars. However, several of his aides considered it to be among his finest orations. Journalist Jack Newfield was of the opinion that the address was a suitable epitaph for the senator, who was assassinated two months later.

== Background ==
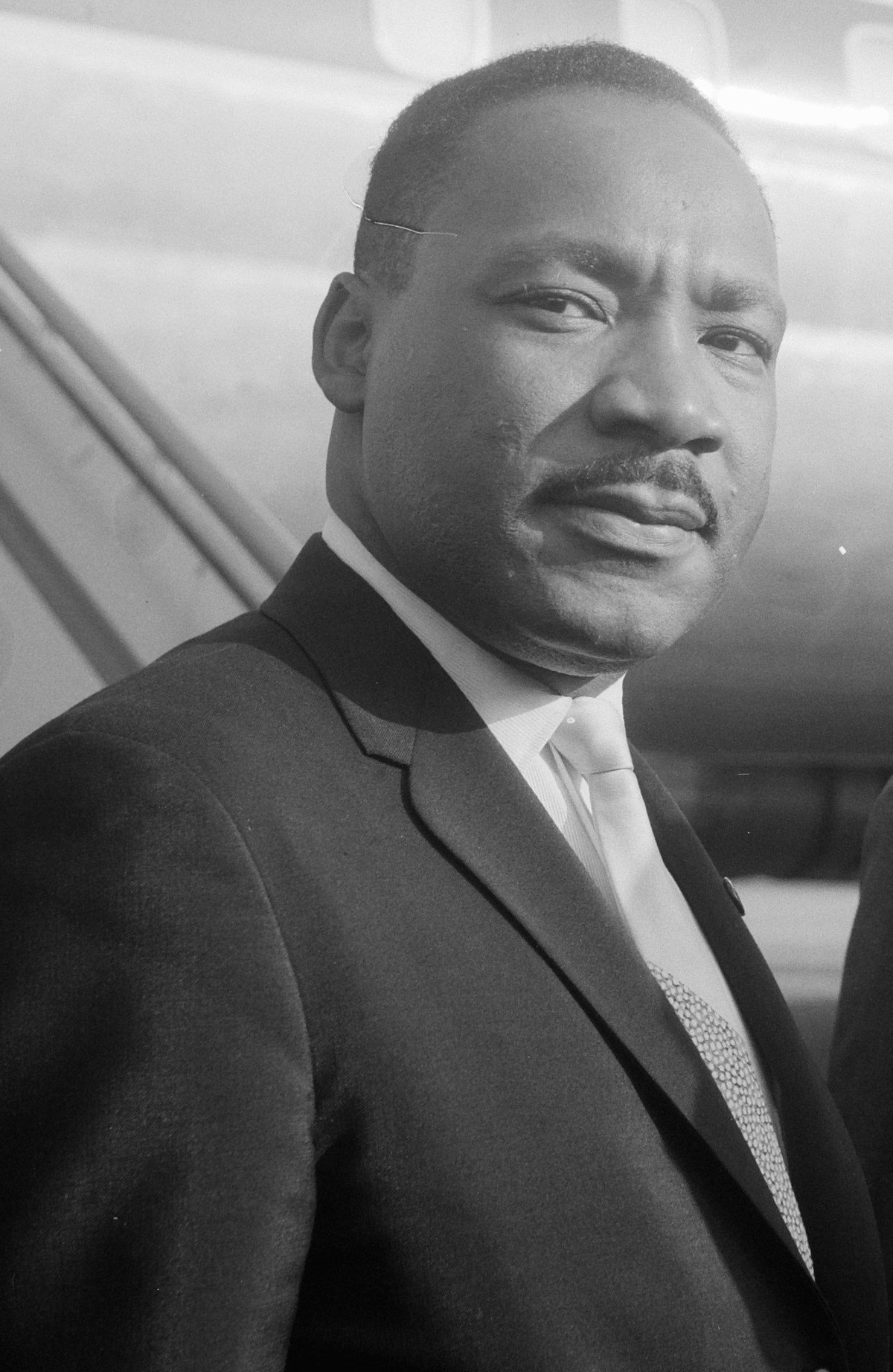
Martin Luther King Jr., whose death greatly upset civil rights activists and led to a wave of riots across the United States

On April 4, 1968, African-American civil rights leader Martin Luther King Jr. was assassinated by a sniper in Memphis, Tennessee. United States senator Robert F. Kennedy was traveling to Indianapolis to promote his presidential campaign when he heard the news. He delivered a brief, improvised speech on the matter before suspending all of his campaign activities and withdrawing to his room at the Marott Hotel. After several phone conversations with African-American community leaders, he decided to speak out against the violent backlash to the assassination and carry on with a scheduled appearance before the City Club of Cleveland. His aides concurred that this was the best course of action, and agreed that he should shortly thereafter go to Washington, D.C., and remain there until King could be buried. Kennedy also spoke over the phone with Coretta Scott King, King's widow, in Atlanta. At her request, Kennedy directed aide Frank Mankiewicz to arrange for a plane to retrieve King's body. Since most air carriers were wary of taking up such a task, a plane was chartered from one of Kennedy's friends. John Lewis and Earl Graves, among others, were dispatched to assist Coretta Scott King. Kennedy also had three additional phone lines installed at the King residence to handle the influx of incoming calls while his staff established a phone bank at West Hunter Baptist Church in Atlanta for the King family's use.

That night at the Marott Hotel, Kennedy hosted a meeting with 14 local black leaders. The meeting had been arranged before the assassination by aide James Tolan and took place in Tolan's room. The group had debated among themselves as to whether they should hold the meeting. Kennedy eventually arrived, and the conversation quickly became heated as leaders accused him of being an unreliable member of "the white establishment." He lost his temper, saying, "I don't need all this aggravation. I could sit next to my swimming pool. You know, God's been good to me and I really don't need anything. But I just feel that if He's been that good, I should try to put something back in. And you all call yourselves leaders and you've been moaning and groaning about personal problems. You haven't once talked about your own people." The meeting ended with most attendees pledging their support to Kennedy's campaign. One of them later acknowledged that Kennedy was "completely sympathetic and understanding".

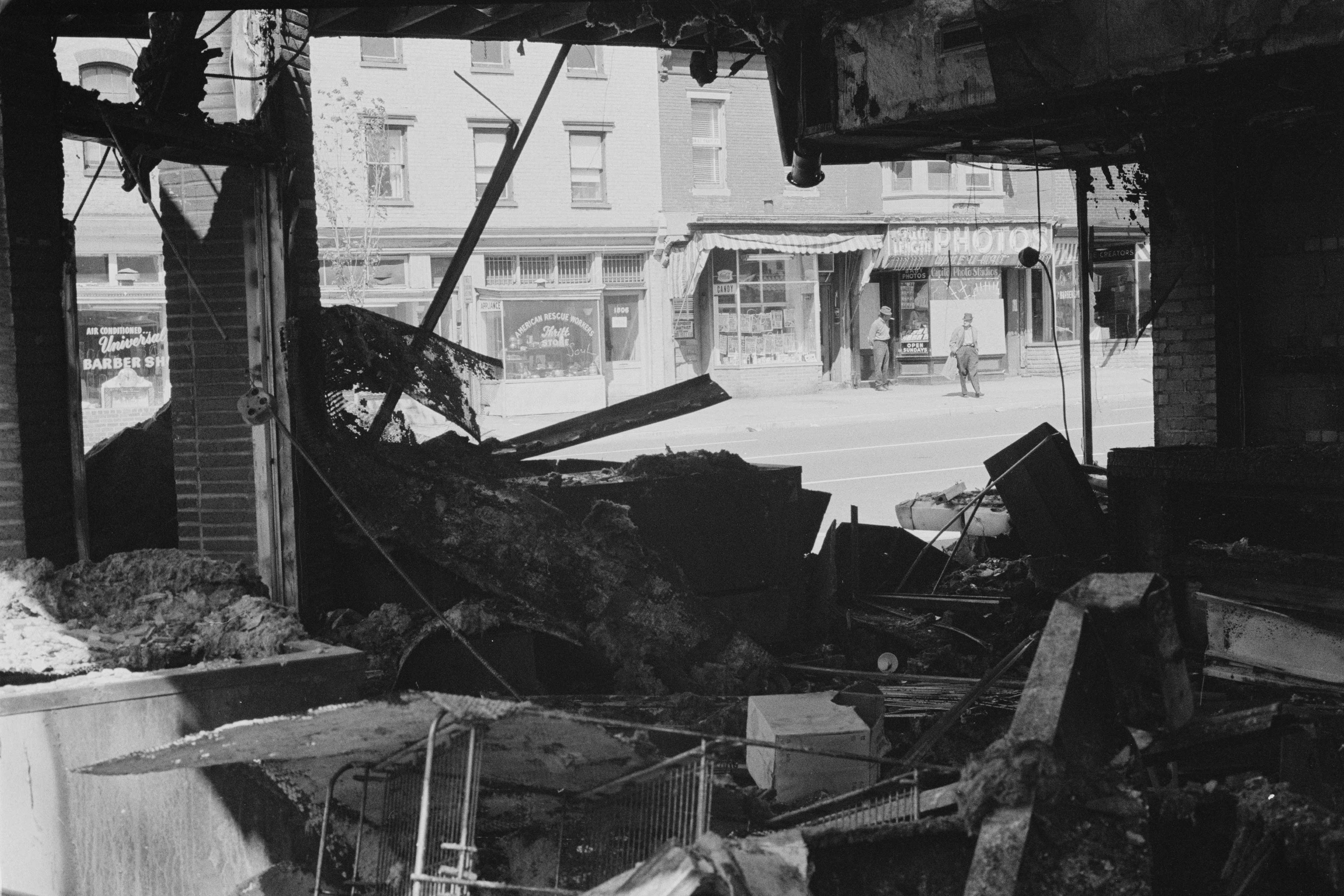
The intensity of the King assassination riots greatly troubled Kennedy and moved him to deliver the speech.

Kennedy then restlessly wandered around the hotel, checking in on his staff. When asked if King's murder had reminded him of the 1963 assassination of United States president John F. Kennedy, his brother, Kennedy replied, "Well, that. But it makes me wonder what they might do to me too." He told speechwriter Jeff Greenfield, "You know, the death of Martin Luther King isn't the worse thing that ever happened in the world." Greenfield later said, "I could not for the life of me understand that callousness until, of course, I realized he had been thinking of the death of his brother."

Meanwhile, in their room, Greenfield and fellow speechwriter Adam Walinsky worked on a formal response to the King assassination with assistance over the phone from Ted Sorensen in New York City. (Note: The original address prepared for the Cleveland City Club, a campaign piece on the economy meant to win the support of local business owners and Democratic Party officials, was not used.) Sorensen's memory differed in that he recalled receiving a call from Kennedy at his home in Washington D.C, rather than New York, on the night of April 4. Kennedy asked for Sorensen's thoughts on a speech being prepared for his appearance in Cleveland and said he would call back within the hour. Sorensen, mindful of the assassination of John F. Kennedy, quickly began writing notes on scrap pieces of paper. When Kennedy called back, Sorensen dictated what he had produced and the senator transcribed it. Mankiewicz later recalled being "occasionally" involved in the drafting process. Walinksy wrote most of the speech.

At about 02:30 on April 5, Kennedy discovered Walinsky asleep over his typewriter and Greenfield passed out on his bed. Kennedy pulled a blanket over Greenfield, who awoke and said, "You aren't so ruthless after all." Kennedy responded, "Don't tell anyone." Later in the morning, Walinsky and Greenfield inserted Sorensen's contributions and finished the speech.

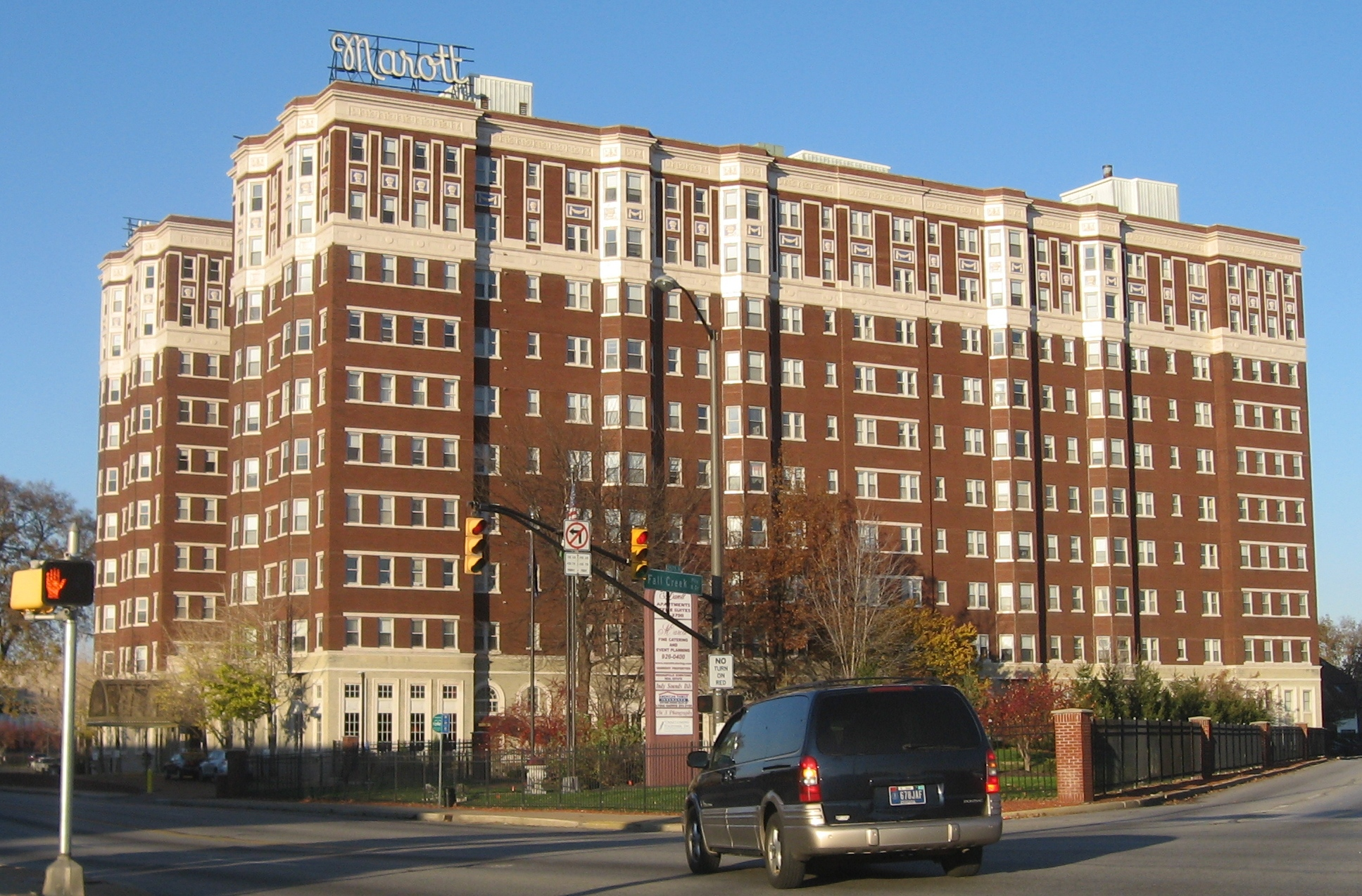
The Marott Hotel, where the speech was drafted by Kennedy's aides

Meanwhile, Kennedy sat down for an interview with entertainer Jack Paar. The senator was in a grave mood; when asked how he thought the White House might accommodate a family as large as his, he responded, "Do you think that is going to be my biggest problem?" When Paar more seriously asked if jobs would solve the problems of urban ghettos, Kennedy replied that while job opportunity was important, it needed to be accompanied by "compassion for one's fellow human beings." Paar then asked, "What did you think when you heard that Dr. King had been assassinated?" Kennedy answered, "That more and more people are turning to violence. And in the last analysis it's going to destroy our country."

During the flight to Cleveland Kennedy reviewed and considerably revised his speech. The plane arrived 90 minutes late. A planned motorcade from Hopkins International Airport was canceled out of respect for King. Instead, the senator rode into the city in an open white convertible. An aide from a phone-equipped vehicle waved down his car and informed him that police believed a sniper might be hiding in a church steeple across from the hotel where he was to give the speech. Bill Barry, Kennedy's bodyguard, recommended that the senator wait alongside the road while he would drive ahead to investigate. Kennedy angrily dismissed the suggestion, saying, "No. We'll never stop for that kind of threat." Kennedy passed through a crowd of approximately 10,000 people in Public Square that had gathered for a memorial service for King. He had been scheduled to speak there as well but canceled the event.

== Speech ==
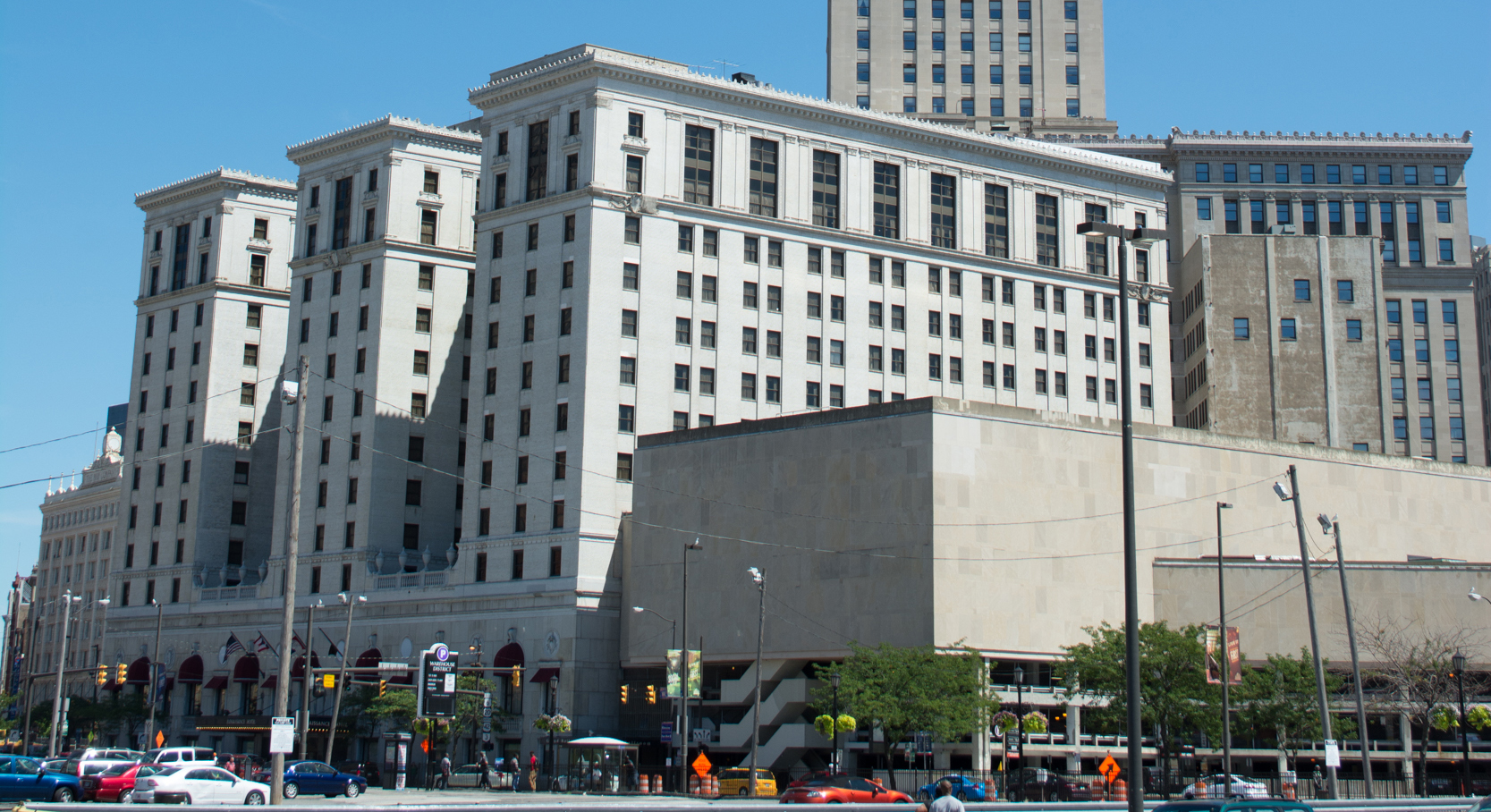
The Sheraton-Cleveland Hotel, the venue for Kennedy's speech

Kennedy's appearance had been anticipated; in the week leading up to the address, the City Club sold over 1,400 tickets for people wishing to attend the luncheon event at the Sheraton-Cleveland Hotel. Local channels WKYC-TV 3 and WEWS-TV 5 interrupted their coverage of the King assassination to televise Kennedy's speech. It was delivered before approximately 2,200 members of the City Club of Cleveland and lasted only for 10 minutes. Kennedy spoke quietly and solemnly, incorporating tragic themes.

=== Summary ===
Kennedy opened by dismissing his own political position and ambition as a presidential candidate and emphasizing the situation at hand, saying,

This is a time of shame and sorrow. It is not a day for politics. I have saved this one opportunity to speak briefly to you about this mindless menace of violence in America which again stains our land and every one of our lives.

This statement set the tone of the speech. The senator then developed a notion of "violence" using strong, emotional language. He noted that violence afflicted all Americans, regardless of race. He proceeded to allude to King's death and to highlight the meaninglessness of violence, asking,

Why? What has violence ever accomplished? What has it ever created? No martyr's cause has ever been stilled by his assassin's bullet. No wrongs have ever been righted by riots and civil disorders. A sniper is only a coward, not a hero, and an uncontrolled, uncontrollable mob is only the voice of madness, not the voice of the people.

By saying this, Kennedy was admonishing people not to riot in wake of King's death and in effect equating their actions to that of the civil rights leader's assassin. After quoting Abraham Lincoln, he portrayed the American public as a people increasingly succumbing to its violent tendencies that undermined its national ideals. He argued that all deaths degraded American society, thereby assuming an uncompromising stance that any and all acts of violence were unacceptable.

Kennedy described how the United States was becoming increasingly tolerant of violence, from the acceptance of news reports on the Vietnam War, to the frequency of killing in movies and television shows, to insufficient gun control. He also criticized double standards on foreign and domestic policy, arguing that some Americans support nonviolence abroad but not within the United States while others who denounced riots were responsible for the conditions that had led to them. The statement led into his next comment, observing that some Americans "look for scapegoats, others look for conspiracies." He then criticized government and private establishment:

For there is another kind of violence, slower but just as deadly, destructive as the shot or the bomb in the night. This is the violence of institutions; indifference and inaction and slow decay. This is the violence that afflicts the poor, that poisons relations between men because their skin has different colors. This is a slow destruction of a child by hunger, and schools without books and homes without heat in the winter. This is the breaking of a man's spirit by denying him the chance to stand as a father and as a man among other men. And this too afflicts us all.

Even in the 1960s, such words were radical and potentially controversial. Kennedy proceeded to caution that when society tries to "teach" people to hate one another or that an individual is a "lesser man" (alluding to racially prejudiced rhetoric common of other public figures), the likelihood of cooperation decreased while the possibility for violent confrontation increased.

Kennedy listed no specific programs or proposals to address the problems at hand, as he believed there was no single solution that would bring an end to violence. Still, the senator asserted that if nothing were done, violence in the United States would persist. He voiced his hope that it could be stopped if people work together to bring about change. As Kennedy approached the end of his speech, his words became more forceful and hopeful. He finished with an allusion to Lincoln's second inaugural address:

Our lives on this planet are too short, the work to be done is too great, to let this spirit flourish any longer in this land of ours. Of course we cannot banish it with a program, nor with a resolution. But we can perhaps remember, if only for a time, that those who live with us are our brothers, that they share with us the same short moment of life, that they seek, as we do, nothing but the chance to live out their lives in purpose and happiness, winning what satisfaction and fulfillment they can. Surely this bond of common fate, this bond of common goals, can begin to teach us something. Surely we can learn, at the least, to look at those around us, as our fellow men, and surely we can begin to work a little harder to bind up the wounds among us, and to become in our hearts brothers and countrymen once again.

Several women were reportedly in tears by the time Kennedy finished. Breaking with the tradition of other City Club speakers, he took no questions from the audience. The audience gave him a standing ovation. While The Plain Dealer, Cleveland's major daily newspaper, praised the speech as "timeless" and devoted a significant amount of coverage to it, Kennedy's remarks received relatively little national media attention. (Note: Mankiewicz wrote that the speech was "largely ignored in news coverage of the King murder".)

== Aftermath ==
After the speech Kennedy took a chartered plane to Washington D.C. As it approached the city, the passengers could see smoke rising from fires started during the riots. Kennedy asked the pilot to circle again to get another view. Upon landing, Kennedy proposed driving into the riot zone to calm down the mobs, saying, "I think I can do something with these people." Most of his aides were shocked at the idea. Fred Dutton, attempting to delay, suggested that Kennedy inform Mayor Walter Washington of his plans as a courtesy. John Bartlow Martin told him that little could be done while people were still rioting, and that he would appear to be grandstanding. Kennedy then reluctantly went home.

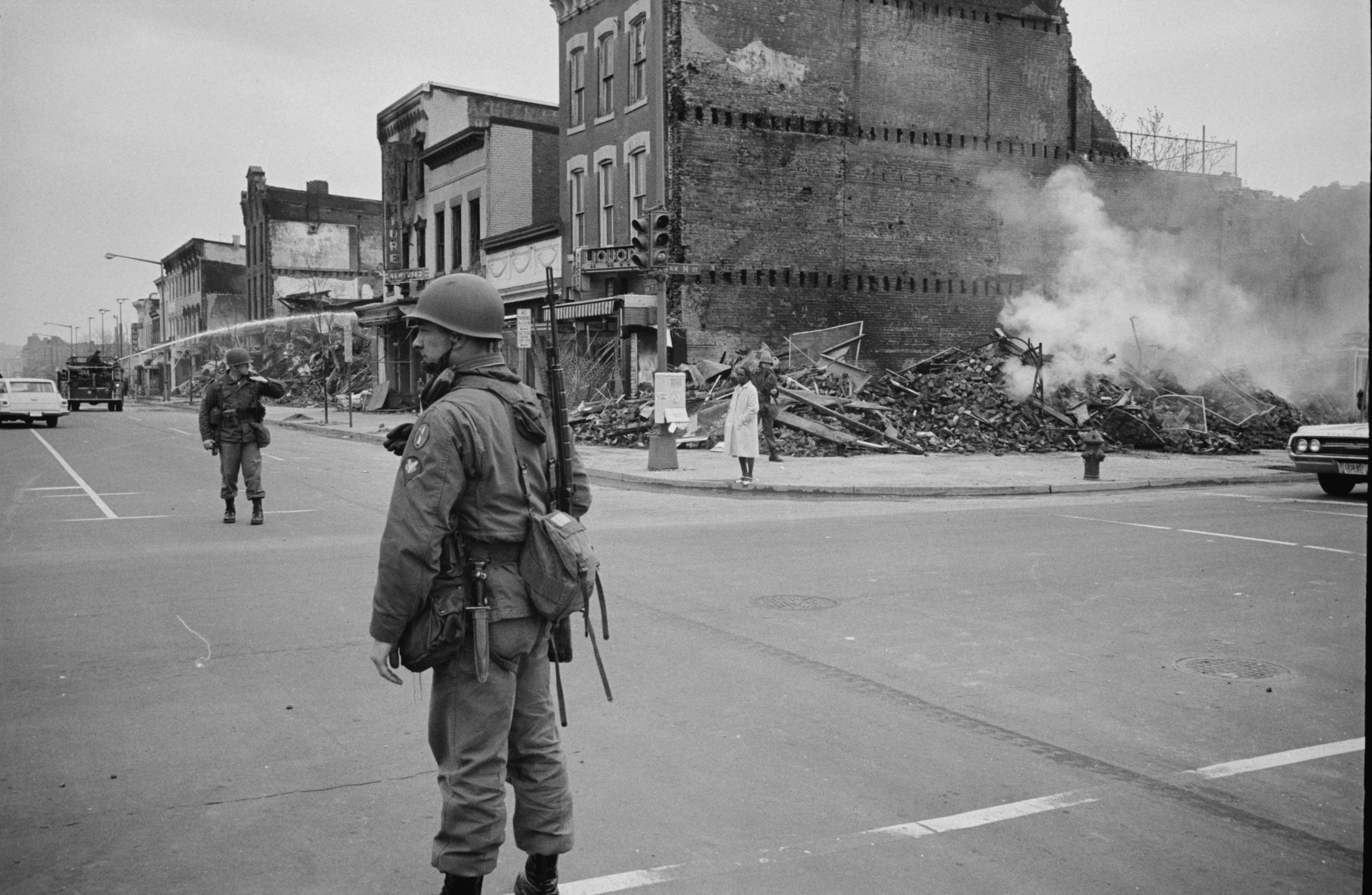
Federal troops patrolling the streets of Washington D.C. following the riots

Two days later Kennedy and his wife, Ethel, attended an 8 a.m. Palm Sunday service at New Bethel Baptist Church in the riot zone. Stokely Carmichael, widely blamed for inciting local disorder, was among the others in the congregation. Kennedy, a devout Catholic, took communion with the rest of the parishioners, much to the chagrin of the Bishop of Washington. After the service he asked the minister, Walter E. Fauntroy, how bad the destruction was in the surrounding area. Fauntroy then walked Kennedy towards the worst devastation on 14th street. Ethel, aide Peter Edelman, Marian Wright Edelman (wife of Peter Edelman), and a small group of reporters, local officials, and parishioners closely followed. People joined the crowd as it walked, becoming so large that a group of National Guardsmen mistook it for a mob of looters. Fearing a confrontation, they put on their gas masks and fixed their bayonets. A trailing police car quickly accelerated and parked itself in between the crowd and the guardsmen to prevent any incident from occurring. Fauntroy remembered, "When [the guardsmen] saw it was Bobby Kennedy, they took off their masks and let us through. They looked awfully relieved."

That evening Kennedy held a televised press conference on the possibility of a domestic Peace Corps-like program to reduce racism in white suburbs. On April 8, Kennedy and his wife went, at the request of Coretta Scott King, to Atlanta to attend Martin Luther King Jr.'s funeral. That evening he held a meeting with his aides over how to get the attention of middle-class whites weary of the civil rights movement in order to relieve the racial tension in the country. Kennedy returned to Indiana and on April 10 delivered his third and final speech inspired by King's death. Moving past his previous calls for compassion and an end to violence, he admonished whites to accept and welcome blacks into American society. Throughout the rest of the month, Kennedy toned down his campaign rhetoric and fixed on a theme of unity and reconciliation. He reiterated the same arguments he delivered in Cleveland about America's internal faults through the rest of his campaign. (Note: John M. Murphy lists Kennedy's new stance on the Vietnam War as an example: "[I]n his first campaign speech, at Kansas State University, Kennedy focused on the spiritual problems of the country but attributed their existence to the Vietnam War. American involvement in the war had brought about the crisis in the nation and the end of that war would resolve the problems...After the Cleveland speech, Kennedy spoke of Vietnam as a symptom of the underlying appetite for violence in America and called for a reaffirmation of American values as the solution.")

== Legacy ==
My father's 'Mindless Menace of Violence' speech in Cleveland laid responsibility for reform at the feet of all Americans. It called not only for a rethinking of state policy, but also for a moral 'cleansing' to remove the 'sickness' of racism and prejudice 'from our souls.'

— Kerry Kennedy, 2018

"On the Mindless Menace of Violence" has been greatly overshadowed by Kennedy's Indianapolis remarks and largely ignored by scholars, but it is still considered by some to be historically significant. Journalist Jack Newfield said the speech was "probably the best written text of the campaign, and perhaps of Kennedy's public career." Another journalist, David Halberstam, considered it "perhaps the best speech of the campaign, perhaps the best speech of his life." Greenfield also later called the address "the best written speech of the campaign." Mankiewicz wrote that it was "perhaps the best speech Robert Kennedy made during the campaign, and certainly one of the best of his career" and "the most eloquent and memorable of RFK's view of humanity and the threats to its flowering and [...] survival." Journalist Jules Witcover said that the "speech was, in a very real sense, a turning point in the presidential campaign of Robert Kennedy," as it allowed him to find new themes around which to reorient his campaign. Following Kennedy's assassination in June 1968, Representative Charles Vanik of Ohio, in a speech before the House of Representatives, called the City Club address the late senator's "most significant statement [...] on crime and violence". In Newfield's opinion the speech was a suitable epitaph for Kennedy himself. (Note: Witcover, alluding to the Kennedy assassination, wrote, "It was a speech that could have been delivered, without a word changed, two months later to the day, about an equally senseless act in Los Angeles.")

In 1999, Marian Wright Edelman delivered a speech in Colorado during which she quoted Kennedy's address. Shortly after the 2015 San Bernardino attack, she gave a speech at the Children's Defense Fund's 25th annual Beat the Odds Awards ceremony deploring gun violence and citing Kennedy's words. President Barack Obama quoted the senator's remarks in an open letter to American law enforcement in the aftermath of the 2016 shooting of Dallas police officers. Journalist and former White House Press Secretary Bill Moyers wrote about the speech after the Dallas shooting, saying, "Today, [Kennedy's] moving words are still so relevant". John M. Murphy described the oration as an "American jeremiad" and said that it "resembled a sermon more than a campaign address." According to The Weekly Standard, "[I]t played a role in making the word violence synonymous with any lamentable social ill."

While many books and movies discuss Kennedy's Indianapolis speech at length, most entirely omit his Cleveland remarks or mention them only in passing. The most high-profile portrayal occurred in the 2006 film Bobby, when the speech was spoken at the end over both real and recreated footage of Kennedy's assassination in California. Robert F. Kennedy's daughter, Kerry, later said, "I actually think that the speech that he gave in Cleveland would have always been viewed as the best speech he ever gave except for the speech he gave the day before." Following the Virginia Tech shooting in 2007, historian Zachary J. Martin wrote a book about the speech, The Mindless Menace of Violence: Robert F. Kennedy's Vision and the Fierce Urgency of Now, which was published in 2009. A 2015 short film entitled The Mindless Menace of Violence depicted gun violence in various American neighborhoods between a diverse array of people with portions of audio of the speech overlaying the video. The City Club of Cleveland hosted an event on April 5, 2018, to commemorate the 50th anniversary of the delivery of the address.

== See also ==
- Robert F. Kennedy's speech on the assassination of Martin Luther King Jr.
- Day of Affirmation Address

== Sources ==
- "Kennedy's Talk In Cleveland to Eulogize King". The Daily Reporter. Cleveland. Associated Press. April 5, 1968. p. 10.
- Clarke, Thurston (2008). The Last Campaign: Robert F. Kennedy and 82 Days That Inspired America (Illustrated ed.). Macmillan. ISBN 978-0-8050-7792-6.
- Crines, Andrew S.; Moon, David S.; Lehrman, Robert; Thody, Philip, eds. (2016). Democratic Orators from JFK to Barack Obama. Rhetoric, Politics and Society (illustrated ed.). Springer. ISBN 978-1-137-50903-1.
- Dooley, Brian (1995). Robert Kennedy: The Final Years (reprint ed.). Ryburn Publishing. ISBN 978-1-85331-103-1.
- Drury, Jeffrey P. Mehltretter; Crouch, Cole A. (February 14, 2017). "Robert F. Kennedy, "Statement on the Death of Reverend Martin Luther King, Rally in Indianapolis, Indiana" (April 4, 1968) and Robert F. Kennedy, "Remarks at the Cleveland City Club" (April 5, 1968)" (PDF). Voices of Democracy. 11: 1–24.
- Duffy, Bernard K.; Leeman, Richard W. (2005). American Voices: An Encyclopedia of Contemporary Orators. Santa Barbara, California: Greenwood Publishing Group. ISBN 978-0-313-32790-2.
- Guthman, Edwin O.; Allen, C. Richard, eds. (1993). RFK: Collected Speeches. New York City: Viking. ISBN 978-0-670-84873-7.
- Mankiewicz, Frank; Swerdlow, Joel L. (2016). So As I Was Saying . . .: My Somewhat Eventful Life (illustrated ed.). Macmillan. ISBN 978-1-4668-8097-9.
- Martin, Zachary J. (2009). The Mindless Menace of Violence: Robert F. Kennedy's Vision and the Fierce Urgency of Now. Lanham, Maryland: Hamilton Books. ISBN 978-0-7618-4450-1.
- Memorial Services: In the Congress of the United States and Tributes in Eulogy of Robert Francis Kennedy, Late a Senator from the State of New York. United States Government Printing Office. 1968.
- Murphy, John M. (June 5, 2009). ""A time of shame and sorrow": Robert F. Kennedy and the American jeremiad". Quarterly Journal of Speech. 76 (4): 401–414. doi:10.1080/00335639009383933.
- Newfield, Jack (1988). Robert Kennedy: A Memoir (3rd ed.). New York City: Plume. ISBN 978-0-452-26064-1.
- Palermo, Joseph A. (2013). In His Own Right: The Political Odyssey of Senator Robert F. Kennedy (illustrated, reprint ed.). Columbia University Press. ISBN 978-0-231-50265-8.
- Rothman, Lily (July 19, 2016). "President Obama Turns to Kennedy Speech for Open Letter to Law Enforcement". Time.
- Schlesinger, Arthur M. Jr. (2002). Robert Kennedy and His Times. Vol. 2 (reprint ed.). Houghton Mifflin Harcourt. ISBN 978-0-618-21928-5.
- Simko, Christina (2015). The Politics of Consolation: Memory and the Meaning of September 11. Oxford University Press. ISBN 978-0-19-938179-1.
- Thomas, Evan (2002). Robert Kennedy: His Life (illustrated, reprint ed.). Simon and Schuster. ISBN 978-0-7432-0329-6.
- Tye, Larry (2016). Bobby Kennedy: The Making of a Liberal Icon. Random House Publishing Group. ISBN 978-0-679-64520-7.
- United Press International (April 6, 1968). "RFK: A Time of Sorrow". The Times Recorder. Cleveland. p. 5.
- Witcover, Jules (1988). 85 days: the last campaign of Robert Kennedy (reprint ed.). Quill. ISBN 978-0-688-07859-1.
