= Political journalism =

Branch of journalism

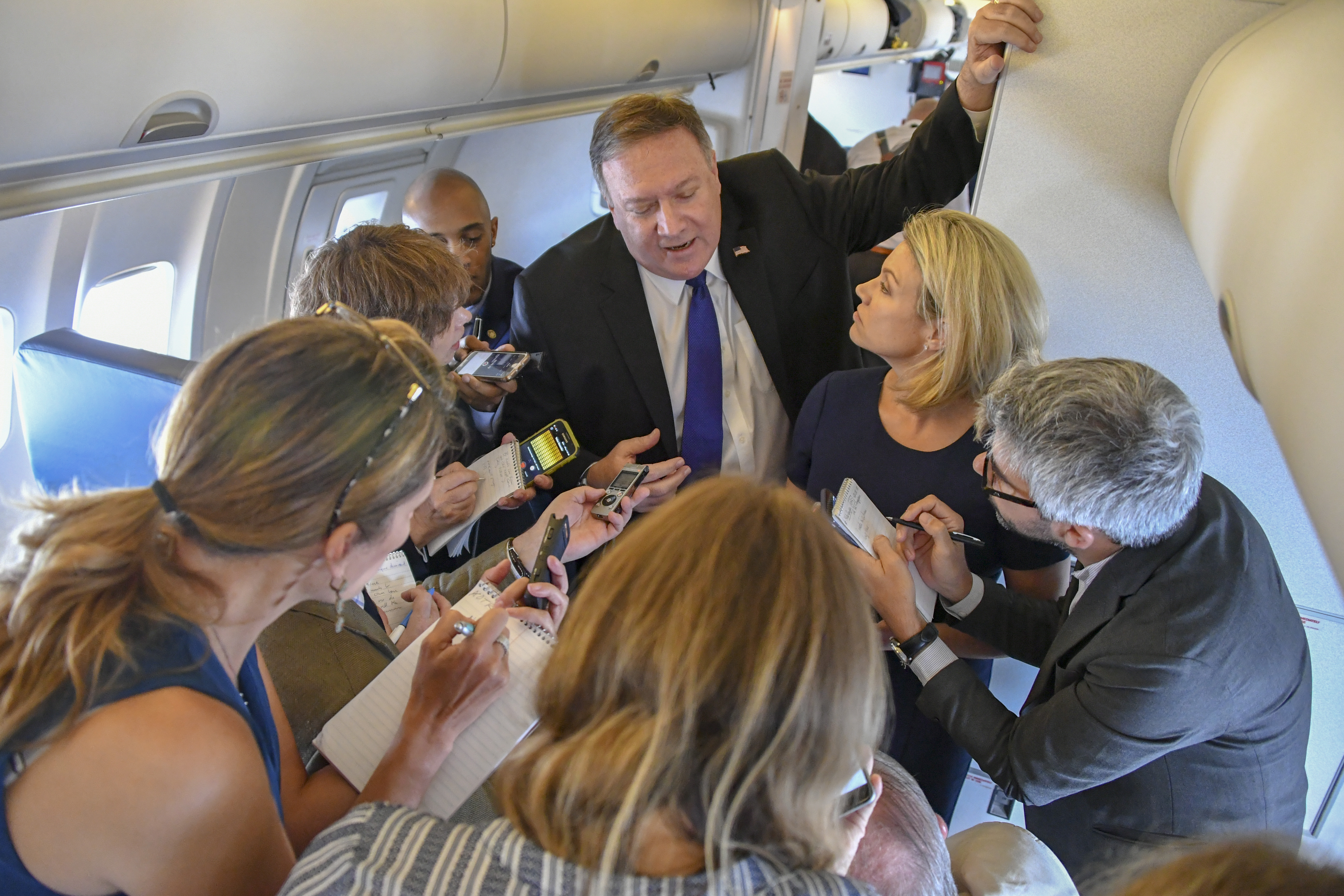
Members of the press ask questions of US Secretary of State Mike Pompeo.

Political journalism is a broad branch of journalism that includes coverage of all aspects of politics and political science, although the term usually refers specifically to coverage of civil governments and political power.

Political journalism aims to provide voters with the information to formulate their own opinion and participate in community, local or national matters that will affect them. According to Ed Morrissey in an opinion article from theweek.com, political journalism frequently includes opinion journalism, as current political events can be biased in their reporting. The information provided includes facts, its perspective is subjective and leans towards one viewpoint.

Brendan Nyhan and John M. Sides argue that "Journalists who report on politics are frequently unfamiliar with political science research or question its relevance to their work". Journalists covering politics who are unfamiliar with information that would provide context to their stories can enable the story to take a different spin on what is being reported.

Political journalism is provided through different mediums, in print, broadcast, or online reporting. Digital media use has increased and it provides instant coverage of campaigns, politics, event news, and an accessible platform for the candidate. Media outlets known for their political journalism like The New York Times and the Washington Post, have increased their use of this medium as well. Printed, online, and broadcast political humor presented as entertainment has been used to provide updates on aspects of government status, political news, campaign, and election updates. According to Geoffrey Baym, the information provided may not be considered "fake news" but the lines between entertainment and factual news may seem blurred or biased while providing political updates. Political journalism is analyzed, interpreted, and discussed by news media pundits and opinion writers. Biased reporting can also take away the audience's ability to form their own opinions. This type of reporting is subjective with a possible social or political purpose.

== Overview ==
Civic journalism has begun to develop a strong following again after first emerging as a philosophy in the late 1980s and early 1990s. Those who find civic journalism to be a new, progressive, and profound method for the media to engage with the public see it as an opportunity to revitalize democracy as we know it. It is becoming less common for the general public to buy newspapers or watch TV news to inform themselves on events in the political sphere. Overall, democracy is beginning to fail as there is a lack of civic engagement and even interference with democratic processes, such as Russia's involvement with the 2016 United States election, and even electronic voting (e-voting) machines that are being hacked and altering results. Proponents of civic journalism believe that democracy requires the media to be receptive to feedback from the public and proactively engage the public as well.

According to Oxford Research Encyclopedias, the popularity of political journalism is rising, and the area is becoming one of the more dominant domains of journalism. Political journalism is meant to be more of an overseer of the democratic process as they relate to civic engagement rather than a scapegoat for the issues with democracy. Including this, there are four key concepts that political journalism can be boiled down to. These concepts are the framing of politics as a strategic game, interpretive versus straight news, conflict framing and media negativity, and finally, political or partisan bias. In essence, these can be viewed as the four quintessential pillars of civic journalism.

In the field of political journalism there is often tension between politicians and journalists which can influence both the reporting quality and the content that is being produced by news outlets.

Jay Rosen argues that framing reinforces the savvy style of political journalism in today's society. Journalists who use this style interpret political events through the lens of strategy and tactics as well as political positioning and the likelihood of electoral success. Rosen argues that the emphasis on political strategy is the main reason for the shift in attention away from evaluating policies or ensuring politicians or political actors remain accountable for their actions and decisions.

Political journalism can serve three main functions in support of democracy. The first one is providing information to citizens, the second is acting as a watchdog over political power, and serving as a forum for public and political discussions.

== Goals ==
The goal of civic journalism, or public journalism, is to allow the community to remain engaged with journalists and news outlets, restore democratic values, and rebuild the public's trust in journalists. Proponents of civic journalism believe that this philosophy will allow individuals to have a greater say in decision-making and in the broader political sphere.

== Supporters and opponents ==
According to the University of Nebraska-Lincoln College of Journalism and Mass Communications, civic journalism is a polarizing philosophy and has a collection of opponents as well. Such opponents of civic journalism find it to be risky and ineffective. They also find the practice to bring about conflicts of interest and believe that it necessitates involvement in public affairs deemed to be unethical. John Bender, assistant professor of new editorial at the University of Nebraska-Lincoln, claimed that journalists who are the most esteemed and highly regarded play active roles in helping their community thrive. That practice would be an example of how civic journalism is indeed beneficial for the future of democracy as proponents believe.

The University of Washington also delves into the world of political journalism with the article entitled "Where Media and Politics Meet". This takes a long hard look at the currently political climate, and how exactly the media can play a positive role in that climate.

Rhetoric in political journalism has been gaining popularity since the 60s, and has become more of an artform than anything since then. Many titans have leapt across the industry in various forms, whether it be Hunter S. Thompson's "Gonzo journalism" style of following the political campaigns on the road, or Barbra Walters hard-hitting interviews. Today, with the introduction of social media the news-cycle has become a cycle of attention grabbing pieces that run for no longer than 24-hours. Political journalism affects opportunities in the tech industry in different ways. For example, political journalism often reports on government initiatives pertaining to different incentives, laws, taxes, and data privacy rules.

Proponents of civic journalism are steadfast on certain issues. They believe that integrating journalism into the democratic process helps to inform voters and makes them more aware of what is occurring in the political sphere. Including this, it could make a difference in the democratic process if all voters were equally informed. Accuracy in political news and journalism can enable voters to be more involved in the democratic process. Civic journalism itself is the process of integrating journalism into the democratic process and allowing voters and the media to play a more active role rather than being witnesses and bystanders in what happens in the political sphere.

== Subsets ==
- Social Media Journalism is a subgenre of journalism that covers the bottom three subgenre's through social media platforms such as Twitter, Instagram, TikTok, etc. With the new rise in technology, many may see original journalism as an outdated method, its vitality to our society in the political realm is monumental. Viewers of social media journalism are not just viewers anymore, but they are commenters now. They are not only passive receivers of media that is approved by an elite, but they are active participants in political communication that is held among the people. Influencers have the ability to be unrestricted in their reports on news and those who follow them or engage in discourse are able to engage with and see multiple perspectives and beliefs both similar and different to their own. The increase in digital media and social platforms has changed political journalism according to Alison Hill. Digital media has allowed politicians to communicate directly with voters online by reaching voters via blogs and other platforms like podcasts as well as independent news outlets.
- Election journalism or electoral journalism is a subgenre of political journalism which focuses upon and analyzes developments related to an approximate election and political campaigns. This type of journalism provides information to the electorate that can educate and help form opinion that empowers a specific vote. This subgenre, like data journalism, makes use of numerical data, such as statistics, polls and historic data in regards to a candidate's chance of success for office, or a party's change in size in a legislature. It provides knowledge that may make the presented news hold more relevance. Information added to the reports are of campaign statuses and political events. A politician's strategy can be exaggerated or provided without context or historical perspective. Trends on each party candidate are reported and at times compared to previous party candidates. The news on the status of the elections, like other political reportings, are provided in different mediums. The election report coverage has taken full advantage of the digital era in providing instant access to news.
- Defense journalism or military journalism is a subgenre that focuses upon the current status of a nation's military, intelligence and other defense-related faculties. Interest in defense journalism tends to increase during times of violent conflict, with military leaders being the primary actors. During the course of military journalism, news reporters are sometimes assigned to military units to report news taking place in areas of conflict. The term "embedded journalism" was used when the media was involved in the reporting of the war in Iraq. Embedded journalism can also be biased because it is one-sided. Information reported has been collected from the area the journalist has been stationed with the possibility to lean towards the agenda of the group they have been assigned to. This subgenre of political journalism is also applied to media coming from journalists embedded in a particular campaign or candidate. Like military assignments, reports can be influenced by the message the campaign or candidate is trying to bring across.
- Environmental journalism is a subgenre of journalism that focuses on the reporting and analysis of environmental issues and trends. This branch of journalism seeks to cover topics related to the natural environment, conservation efforts, climate change, pollution, and sustainability practices. Environmental journalists play a crucial role in educating the public about the importance of environmental stewardship and the impacts of human activity on the planet. They investigate and report on environmental policies, practices of corporations, government actions, and the efforts of non-governmental organizations. Much like election and defense journalism, environmental journalism often relies on data and scientific research to inform its reports. Journalists may use data on temperature changes, pollution levels, loss of biodiversity, and the status of natural resources to provide a comprehensive view of environmental issues. This subgenre also explores the social, economic, and political implications of environmental policies and practices, highlighting how these issues intersect with public health, equity, and economic development.

== See also ==
- Afghanistanism
- BBC
- Common Sense (pamphlet)
- Daniel Defoe
- The Federalist Papers
- List of United States political catchphrases, slogans and rhetoric
- Mediatization (media)
- News conference
- Pamphleteer
- Parliamentary sketch writing
- Political blog
- Political scandal
- Press gaggle
- Press pool
- The Staple of News
- Jonathan Swift
