= Grave of Robert F. Kennedy =

Historic gravesite

Coordinates: 38°52′52.3″N 77°4′17.3″W

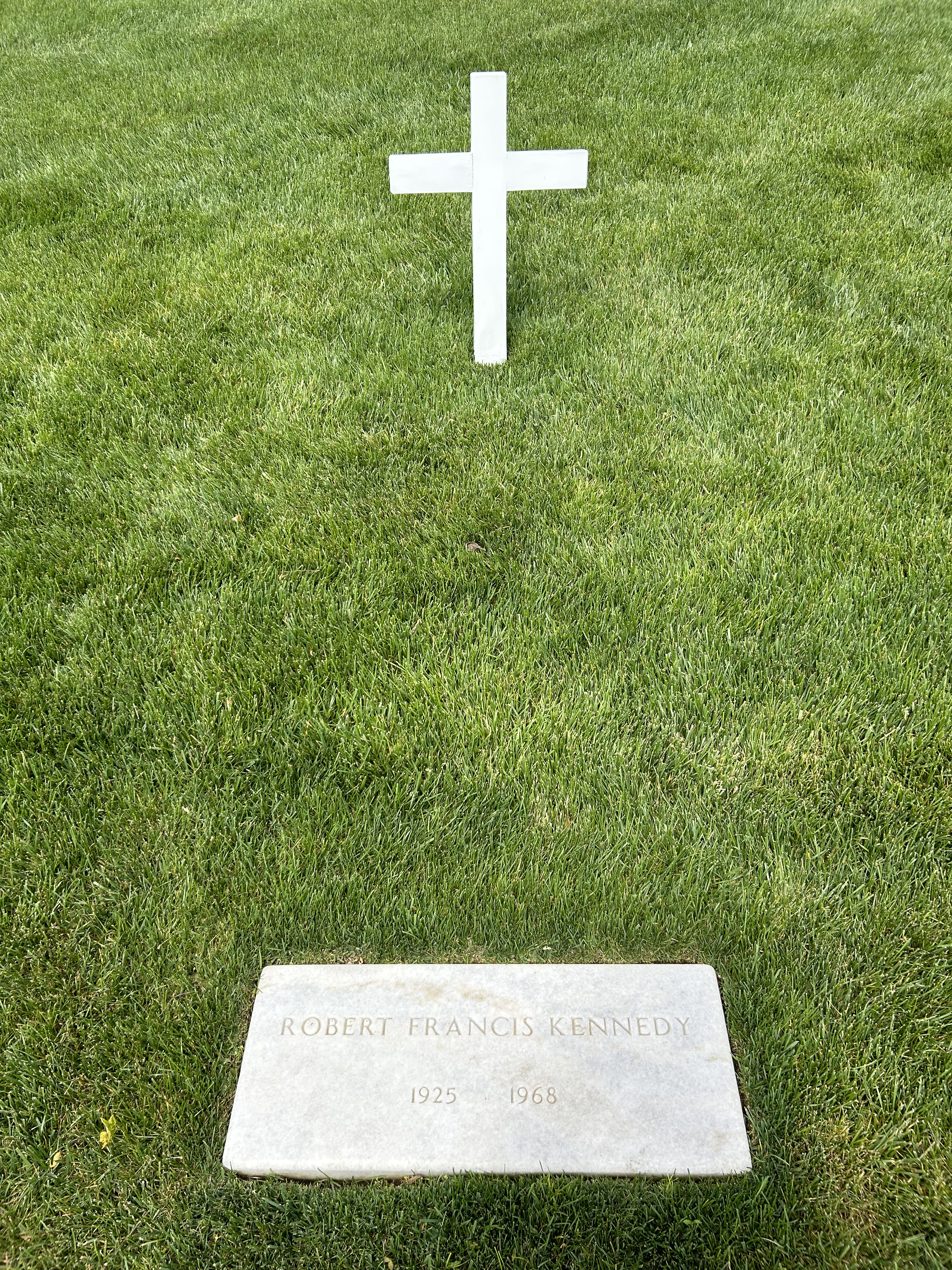
Grave of Robert F. Kennedy in 2023, prior to Ethel Kennedy's death

The grave of Robert F. and Ethel Kennedy is a historic grave site and memorial to assassinated United States Senator and 1968 Democratic presidential candidate Robert F. Kennedy and his wife Ethel Skakel Kennedy, located in section 45 of Arlington National Cemetery in Arlington County, Virginia, in the United States. It was dedicated on December 6, 1971, and replaced a temporary grave in which Kennedy was originally buried on June 8, 1968. Ethel was buried next to her husband on November 25, 2024, 56 years after her husband's death. It is adjacent to the John F. Kennedy Eternal Flame.

The grave is aligned along an east–west axis, roughly along the line of sight between Arlington House and the Jefferson Memorial. The grave consists of an unadorned, white wooden cross at the head of the grave and a simple grey granite marker with the names of Robert and Ethel set flush with the earth at the foot of it.

The memorial consists of a small semicircular granite plaza, which provides viewing for the grave. At the back (straight) axis of the plaza is a low rectangular grey granite wall inscribed with quotations from two of Kennedy's speeches. A small, rectangular reflecting pool is at the base of the wall.

== Initial burial at Arlington National Cemetery ==
Robert F. Kennedy was shot and mortally wounded on June 5, 1968. He died at 1:44 AM on June 6. Kennedy's body was flown aboard Air Force One to New York City on the evening of June 6, where it lay in repose in St. Patrick's Cathedral from approximately 10:00 PM until 10:00 AM on June 8.

Selection of the burial site occurred almost immediately after Kennedy's death. Kennedy had often said he wished to be buried in the family plot in Massachusetts, but the Kennedy family decided to have him buried at Arlington National Cemetery next to John F. Kennedy instead. Late on June 6, Alfred B. Fitt, Assistant Secretary of Defense for Manpower and Reserve Affairs, flew from Washington to New York City to confer with the Kennedy family about burial at Arlington National Cemetery. The family had already decided to bury Robert F. Kennedy near his brother's memorial, and Fitt carried with him photographs of several areas of the John F. Kennedy grave site which would be suitable as a burial site. At 10:30 PM on June 7, the Kennedy family announced that Robert F. Kennedy would be buried at Arlington National Cemetery in a grassy area just southeast of the John F. Kennedy grave site.

A high requiem mass attended by Ethel Kennedy (Kennedy's widow), Kennedy's children, Jacqueline Kennedy and her children, Rose Kennedy (Kennedy's mother) members of the extended Kennedy family, President Lyndon B. Johnson and his wife Lady Bird Johnson, and members of the Johnson Cabinet was held at St. Patrick's Cathedral at 10:00 AM on June 8. Kennedy's body was taken by train from Pennsylvania Station in New York City to Union Station in Washington, D.C. It was due to depart New York at 12:30 PM, but was delayed by the slow pace of mourners leaving the cathedral. The normally four-hour trip took eight hours and six minutes, due to the thick crowds lining the tracks on the 225-mile (362 km) journey. In Elizabeth, New Jersey, a north-bound train struck two people who had moved out of the way of the funeral train, and the Kennedys asked their engineers to slow down even more.

Scheduled to arrive at about 4:30 PM, the funeral train arrived in Washington at 9:10 PM on June 8. All funeral flowers were taken to Arlington National Cemetery, where they lay in deep banks on the hill around the grave site. Floodlights were rushed into position in order to illuminate the burial site. More than 1,500 candles were hurriedly donated by the Cathedral of St. Matthew the Apostle (where John F. Kennedy's funeral had occurred) and handed out to the crowd and the mourners. As the funeral motorcade entered the cemetery, the crowd lining the roadway spontaneously lit their candles—lighting the way. The hearse arrived at the grave site at 10:24 PM, and the 15-minute ceremony (originally scheduled to begin at 5:30 PM) began six minutes later. The service ended at 10:45 PM. Cardinal Patrick O'Boyle, Roman Catholic Archbishop of Washington, officiated at the graveside service in lieu of Cardinal Richard Cushing of Boston, who fell ill during the trip. Archbishop of New York Terence Cooke also officiated. Astronaut John Glenn folded the American flag which draped the coffin, and handed it to Senator Kennedy, who handed it to Joseph P. Kennedy II, eldest son of Robert Kennedy. Joseph handed the flag to his mother, Ethel. Kennedy's coffin was lowered into the grave after family and friends had departed, and his body buried at 11:34 PM.

Arlington National Cemetery officials claimed in 2011 that Robert F. Kennedy's burial is the only one ever to have taken place at night in the cemetery. However, in 1963, there was another night burial in the cemetery. Shortly after John F. Kennedy's burial, his two infant children were buried next to him in Arlington at night. Senator Edward M. Kennedy's burial in 2009 also occurred at night.

As with John F. Kennedy, Robert Kennedy's first grave was a temporary one, about 10 feet (3.0 m) upslope from its current location. A simple white wooden cross stood at the head of the grave, while a spray of flowers marked the foot of it. About 50,000 people (7,000 in the first three hours alone) visited the grave the day after the burial, while another 20,000 visited it the second day. More than 7 million people visited both Kennedy grave sites between June 10, 1968, and June 6, 1969.

== Permanent grave site and memorial ==
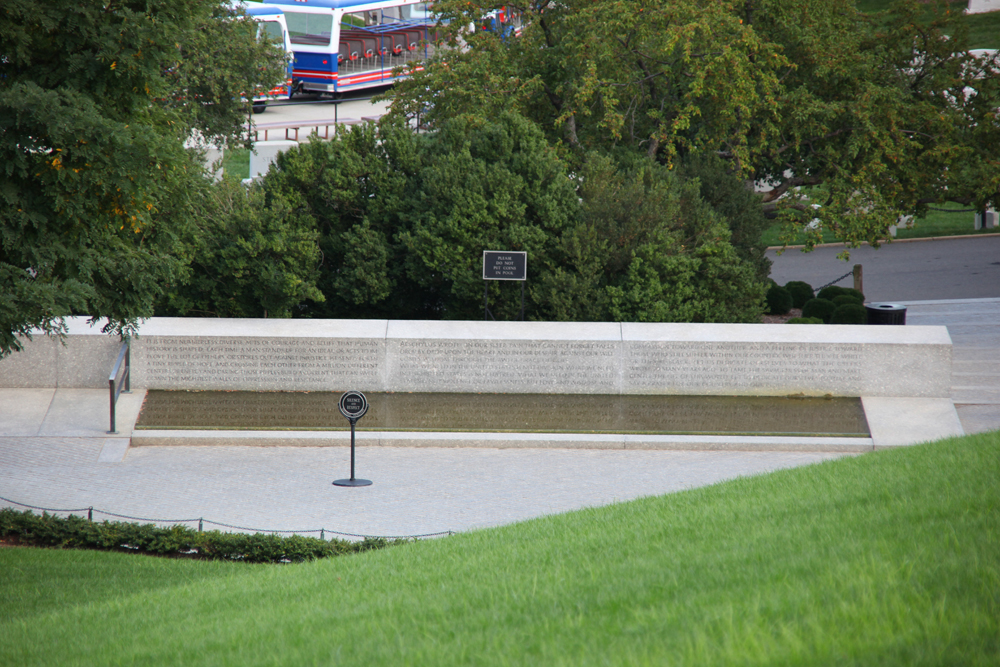
Looking down from Custis Walk at the Robert F. Kennedy memorial. The grave is out of sight just below the hill.

The design of a permanent grave and memorial for Robert F. Kennedy was undertaken by the United States Army in full consultation with the Kennedy family. The family decided to build a memorial in the early fall of 1968. In late 1968, Ethel Kennedy chose I. M. Pei as the architect. Pei had worked with Robert F. Kennedy in 1966 as a consultant for a rejuvenation project of the Bedford–Stuyvesant neighborhood in Brooklyn. and had been chosen by the Kennedy family as the architect for the John F. Kennedy Presidential Library and Museum in Boston.

Pei's design for the grave and memorial strongly reflected that of the nearby John F. Kennedy grave site designed by John Carl Warnecke, but on a much smaller scale. It was clear from the outset that the grave itself would not receive any special treatment. When John F. Kennedy was buried, Robert Kennedy had argued for a simple white cross for a burial marker. He was overruled by Jacqueline Kennedy. Bowing to Robert Kennedy's previously expressed thoughts on the matter, the Kennedy family chose to adorn his grave with only a cross and a stone. Pei's plan called for an informal grove of trees to surround the grave.

The design for the memorial included a small semicircular plaza, a low grey granite wall inscribed with quotations from Robert Kennedy's speeches (similar to the wall at the John F. Kennedy site), and a small reflecting pool. The reflecting pool was designed to be only a few inches deep and about 4 feet (1.2 m) wide, and to extend the length of the wall. A straight granite pathway lead from the terrace at the John F. Kennedy grave to the semicircular plaza. The original plan called for a grove of trees to be planted between the two Kennedy grave sites (to screen them from one another), another grove to be planted close by, and a large American Beech to be grown south of the plaza.

Pei's design for the grave and memorial took only a few weeks to complete. Using the same agreement reached by the government and the Kennedy family during the construction of the John F. Kennedy memorial, the Kennedy family agreed to pay 58 percent of the total cost of the Robert F. Kennedy site. This covered the grave and the memorial, with the total cost estimated at US$1,016,000. The government's share covered the construction of access roads and pathways, landscaping, and utilities. The plan for the grave site and memorial were approved by the Kennedy family, the U.S. Army, the United States Commission of Fine Arts, and the National Capital Planning Commission.

Using public funds for the grave and memorial proved contentious. Some members of the public expressed anger that the federal government was spending several hundred thousand dollars on a memorial to a private citizen. Others asked why a mere U.S. Senator was receiving special treatment when other senators buried at Arlington were not so honored. Some of these arguments appeared in letters to the editor of The Washington Post. An angry Charles H. Percy, a Republican senator from Illinois, defended the expenditure, arguing that not making the improvements would lead to significant harm to the cemetery grounds as large numbers of people visited the grave. The Washington Post also strongly editorialized in favor of the expenditure.

The United States Army Corps of Engineers submitted a budget request of $431,000 to cover its share of the costs in 1969. But President Johnson, for reasons which were not made clear, deleted the request from the Army's budget submission to Congress. Johnson added the request to the president's contingency fund budget submission instead, which effectively left the decision to build the memorial to the next president, Richard M. Nixon (who took office in January 1969). On February 1, 1969, Nixon approved the expenditure from the presidential funds, and placed presidential aide Bryce Harlow in charge of seeing construction through.

The Army formally announced on June 6, 1969, that the memorial would be built for a total cost of US$677,000, with the Kennedys picking up about 62 percent of the total cost (and agreeing to pay for any cost overruns). The memorial would be due south of the John F. Kennedy grave site. The Army said, however, that construction would not begin until funds had been appropriated by Congress.

As the presidential contingency fund budget request wound its way through Congress, some members of Congress also concluded that the federal government should not pick up the cost of the memorial's access roads and improvements. In the House of Representatives, Representative William J. Scherle (a Republican from Iowa) sponsored an amendment to strip the memorial funds from the president's budget request. The House defeated his amendment, 74-to-27, but the vote showed that there was at least some support for Scherle's position.

The cost of the grave and memorial were estimated again in 1970 and found to still be US$677,000, of which 62 percent would still be borne by the Kennedys. On October 21, 1970, Roubin and Janeiro, Inc. (a construction company based in Fairfax, Virginia) was awarded a contract to construct the new grave and memorial. The value of the contract was US$527,914. The total cost for the project was now US$747,000, with the Kennedy family now paying about 75.8 percent of the total cost. Construction began on November 9, 1970, and was expected to take a year. The approaches to both Kennedy graves were altered when the Robert F. Kennedy memorial was built. Previously, the approaches to the John F. Kennedy site consisted of a series of long steps. But several individuals in wheelchairs appealed to Senator Edward M. Kennedy, and the steps were replaced by long ramps in June 1971. The design for the Robert Kennedy memorial, too, was changed to feature ramps rather than stairs.

=== Final site design ===
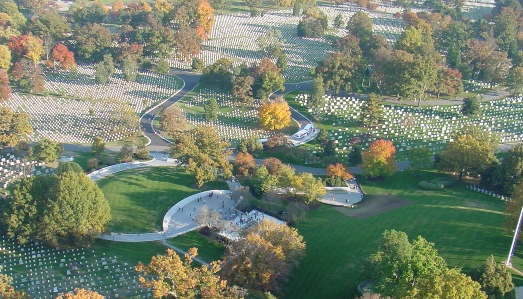
Aerial view of the John F. Kennedy (left) and Robert F. Kennedy graves in 2005, showing the relationship between the two sites.

Robert F. Kennedy was disinterred on December 1, 1971, and his body moved to the new grave site. The disinterment, witnessed by Ethel Kennedy and Senator Edward M. Kennedy, began at 5:30 PM. Reburial was complete at about 9:00 PM. The final grave site and granite plaza were dedicated on December 6, 1971.

Robert F. Kennedy's final resting place is about 50 feet (15 m) southwest of the terrace of the John F. Kennedy grave site. Robert Kennedy is buried upslope from the plaza, his burial vault marked by a white wooden cross at its head and a slate footstone set flush with the earth at its foot. A low granite wall at the rear (straight, southeast side) of the plaza contains quotations from two famous Robert F. Kennedy speeches, with a small reflecting pool at the base of the wall. The granite for the plaza came from Deer Isle, Maine, which was also the source for the granite for the terrace at the John F. Kennedy gravesite.

One quotation, which inspired the reflecting pool, is from a speech Kennedy delivered to students in South Africa in 1966. It reads:

It is from numberless diverse acts of courage and belief that human history is shaped each time a man stands up for an ideal or acts to improve the lot of others or strikes out against injustice. He sends forth a tiny ripple of hope, and crossing each other from a million different centers of energy and daring, those ripples build a current that can sweep down the mightiest wall of oppression and resistance.

The second quotation is from an impromptu address Kennedy gave to an angry crowd of African Americans in Indianapolis, Indiana, the night Dr. Martin Luther King Jr. was assassinated. It reads:

Aeschylus...wrote, "Even in our sleep, pain which cannot forget falls drop by drop upon the heart, until, in our own despair, against our will, comes wisdom through the awful grace of God.' What we need in the United States is not division; what we need in the United States is not hatred; what we need in the United States is not violence and lawlessness; but is love and wisdom, and compassion toward one another, and a feeling of justice toward those who still suffer within our country, whether they be white or whether they be black.

The final cost of the grave and memorial were US$747,000.

Journalist Evan Thomas later wrote that the overall impression left by the Robert F. Kennedy grave and memorial plaza is one of loneliness and sadness.

=== Vandalism and theft ===
On January 4, 1970, vandals uprooted the white cross at the head of Kennedy's grave. Arlington National Cemetery officials quietly placed it back into position the same day.

The cross and the footstone marking Robert F. Kennedy's grave were stolen in 1981 and never recovered. They were replaced.

== Bibliography ==
- Barnes, John A. Irish-American Landmarks. Canton, Mich.: Visible Ink, 1995.
- Bigler, Philip. In Honored Glory: Arlington National Cemetery, the Final Post. 4th ed. St. Petersburg, Fla.: Vandamere Press, 2005. ISBN 0918339677
- Clarke, Thurston. The Last Campaign: Robert F. Kennedy and 82 Days That Inspired America. New York: Henry Holt, 2009.
- Committee on Veterans' Affairs. National Cemeteries Act of 1972: Hearings. Vol. 1. House of Representatives. 92d Cong., 2d sess. Washington, D.C.: U.S. Government Printing Office, 1972.
- Coonerty, Ryan and Highsmith, Carol M. Etched in Stone: Enduring Words From Our Nation's Monuments. Washington, D.C.: National Geographic, 2007.
- Fuentes, Francisca D. "Paul Fusco's RFK Funeral Train: The Photobook as Memory Text." In Writing With Light: Words and Photographs in American Texts. Mick Gidley, ed. New York: P. Lang, 2010.
- Isaacson, Walter. Profiles in Leadership: Historians on the Elusive Quality of Greatness. New York: W.W. Norton, 2010.
- Martin, Zachary J. The Mindless Menace of Violence: Robert F. Kennedy's Vision and the Fierce Urgency of Now. Lanham, Md.: Hamilton Books, 2009.
- Monteith, Sharon. American Culture in the 1960s. Edinburgh: Edinburgh University Press, 2008.
- Morrone, Francis and Iska, James. An Architectural Guidebook to Brooklyn. Layton, Utah: Gibbs Smith, 2001.
- Poole, Robert M. On Hallowed Ground: The Story of Arlington National Cemetery. New York: Walker & Co., 2009.
- Pottker, Janice. Janet and Jackie: The Story of a Mother and Her Daughter, Jacqueline Kennedy Onassis. New York: St. Martin's Griffin, 2001.
- Special Subcommittee on Cemeteries. Committee on Veterans' Affairs. Bills Related to the National Cemetery System. House of Representatives. 91st Cong., 2d sess. Washington, D.C.: U.S. Government Printing Office, 1970.
- Subcommittee on Public Works. Committee on Appropriations. Public Works for Water and Power Development and Atomic Energy Commission Appropriation Bill, 1972. Vol. 2. House of Representatives. 92d Cong., 1st sess. Washington, D.C.: U.S. Government Printing Office, 1971.
- Thomas, Evan. "RFK Funeral Train, June 8, 1968." In RFK Funeral Train. Paul Fusco, ed. Stockport, NY: Dewi Lewis, 2001.
- Wiseman, Carter. I.M. Pei: A Profile in American Architecture. New York: H.N. Abrams, 2001.
