= Robert F. Kennedy's speech on the assassination of Martin Luther King Jr. =

1968 speech by U.S. senator Robert F. Kennedy

Coordinates: 39°47′27″N 86°8′47″W

Robert F. Kennedy giving his speech

Audio of the speech

On April 4, 1968, United States senator Robert F. Kennedy of New York delivered an improvised speech several hours after the assassination of Martin Luther King Jr. Kennedy, who was campaigning to earn the Democratic Party's presidential nomination, made his remarks while in Indianapolis, Indiana, after speaking at two Indiana universities earlier in the day. Before boarding a plane to attend campaign rallies in Indianapolis, he learned that King had been shot in Memphis, Tennessee. Upon arrival, Kennedy was informed that King had died. His own brother, John F. Kennedy had been assassinated on November 22, 1963. Robert F. Kennedy would also be assassinated two months after his speech, while campaigning for presidential nomination at the Ambassador Hotel in Los Angeles, California.

Despite fears of riots and concerns for his safety, Kennedy went ahead with plans to attend a rally at 17th and Broadway in the heart of Indianapolis's African-American ghetto. That evening he addressed the crowd, many of whom had not heard about King's assassination. Instead of the rousing campaign speech they expected, Kennedy offered brief, impassioned remarks for peace that are considered to be one of the great public addresses of the modern era.

== Earlier that day ==
During his speeches at the University of Notre Dame in South Bend and at Ball State University in Muncie, Indiana, Kennedy focused on domestic issues, the Vietnam War, and racism. At Notre Dame's Stepan Center, a crowd of approximately 5,000 heard Kennedy speak on poverty in America and the need for better-paying jobs. When asked about draft laws, Kennedy called them "unjust and inequitable" and argued to end college deferments on the basis that they discriminated against those who could not afford a college education. His speech at Ball State was well received by more than 9,000 students, faculty, and community members. One African-American student raised a question to Kennedy that seems almost a premonition of the speech to come later that night after the horrific events of the day. The student asked, "Your speech implies that you are placing a great deal of faith in white America. Is that faith justified?" Kennedy answered "Yes" and added that "faith in black America is justified, too" although he said there "are extremists on both sides." Before boarding a plane to fly to Indianapolis, Kennedy learned that Martin Luther King Jr. had been shot. On the plane, Kennedy told a reporter "You know, it grieves me. . . that I just told that kid this and then walk out and find that some white man has just shot their spiritual leader." Kennedy did not learn that King was dead until his plane landed in Indianapolis. According to reporter John J. Lindsay, Kennedy "seemed to shrink back as though struck physically" and put his hands to his face, saying "Oh, God. When is this violence going to stop?"

In Indianapolis the news of King's death caused concern among representatives from Kennedy's campaign and city officials, who feared for his safety and the possibility of a riot. After talking with reporters at the Indianapolis airport, Kennedy canceled a stop at his campaign headquarters and continued on to the rally site, where a crowd had gathered to hear him speak. Both Frank Mankiewicz, Kennedy's press secretary, and speechwriter Adam Walinsky drafted notes immediately before the rally for Kennedy's use, but Kennedy refused Walinsky's notes, instead using some that he had likely written on the ride over; Mankiewicz arrived after Kennedy had already begun to speak. The Indianapolis chief of police warned Kennedy that the police could not provide adequate protection for the senator if the crowd were to riot, but Kennedy decided to speak to the crowd regardless. Standing on a podium mounted on a flatbed truck, Kennedy spoke for a little less than six minutes.

== Summary of Indianapolis speech ==
Kennedy began his speech by announcing that King had been killed. He was the first to publicly inform the audience of King's assassination, causing members of the audience to scream and wail in disbelief and grief. Several of Kennedy's aides were worried that the delivery of this information would result in a riot. Once the audience quieted down, Kennedy spoke of the threat of disillusion and divisiveness at King's death and reminded the audience of King's efforts to "replace that violence, that stain of bloodshed that has spread across our land, with an effort to understand with compassion and love." Kennedy acknowledged that many in the audience would be filled with anger, especially since the assassin was believed to be a white man. He empathized with the audience by referring to the assassination of his brother, United States president John F. Kennedy, by a white man. The remarks surprised Kennedy aides, who had never heard him speak of his brother's death in public. Quoting the ancient Greek playwright Aeschylus, (Note: Preparing his notes without reference books, recalling the quote from memory, Kennedy slightly misquoted a passage from Edith Hamilton's translation of Aeschylus's Agamemnon. Professor Christopher S. Morrissey wrote that it is unknown "whether he misquoted deliberately, fortuitously, or infelicitously".) with whom he had become acquainted through his brother's widow, Jacqueline Kennedy, Kennedy said, "Even in our sleep, pain which cannot forget falls drop by drop upon the heart until, in our own despair, against our will, comes wisdom through the awful grace of God."

Kennedy then delivered one of his best-remembered remarks: "What we need in the United States is not division; what we need in the United States is not hatred; what we need in the United States is not violence or lawlessness, but is love and wisdom, and compassion toward one another, and a feeling of justice towards those who still suffer within our country, whether they be white or whether they be black." To conclude, Kennedy reiterated his belief that the country needed and wanted unity between blacks and whites and encouraged the country to "dedicate ourselves to what the Greeks wrote so many years ago: to tame the savageness of man and to make gentle the life of this world." He finished by asking the audience members to pray "for our country and for our people." Rather than exploding in anger at the tragic news of King's death, the crowd exploded in applause and enthusiasm for a second time, before dispersing quietly.

== Aftermath ==
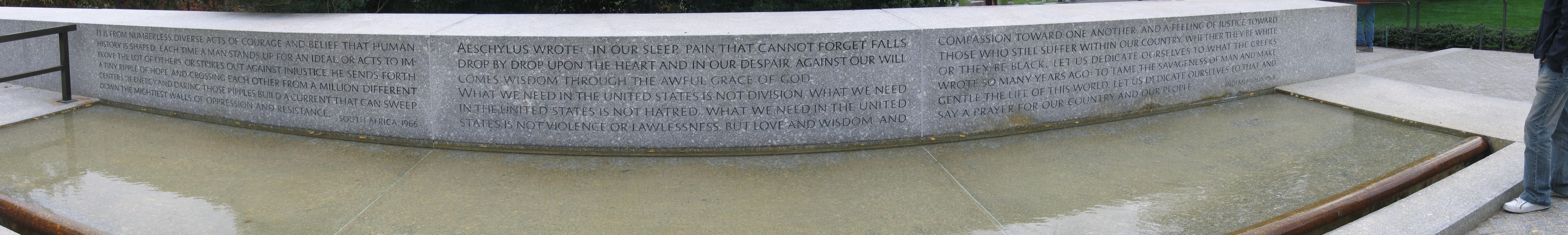
RFK's memorial in Arlington National Cemetery incorporates parts of the speech

Despite the fact the crowd which Kennedy spoke to in Indianapolis was only estimated to be 2,500 people, the speech was credited with boosting his image in the state of Indiana. Indianapolis remained calm that night, which is believed to have been in part because of the speech. In stark contrast to Indianapolis, riots erupted in more than one hundred U.S. cities including Chicago, New York City, Boston, Detroit, Oakland, Pittsburgh, and Baltimore, killing 35 and injuring more than 2,500. Across the country, approximately 70,000 army and National Guard troops were called out to restore order. William Crawford, a member of the Black Radical Action Project who had stood about 20 feet from Kennedy, credited Kennedy's speech for the lack of riots in Indianapolis. Crawford claimed to the Indianapolis Star in 2015 "Look at all those other cities" and "I believe it would have gone that way (in Indianapolis) had not Bobby Kennedy given those remarks."

The following day, Kennedy gave a prepared, formal response, "On the Mindless Menace of Violence", in Cleveland, Ohio. It addressed themes that he had alluded to in the Indianapolis speech.

Two months after Kennedy's speech, Kennedy himself was shot on June 5, 1968, and died the following day.

== Legacy ==
The speech itself has been listed as one of the greatest in American history, ranked 17th by communications scholars in a survey of 20th century American speeches. Former U.S. congressman and media host Joe Scarborough said that it was Kennedy's greatest speech and was what prompted Scarborough to enter public service. Journalist Joe Klein has called it "politics in its grandest form and highest purpose" and said that it "marked the end of an era" before American political life was taken over by consultants and pollsters. It is also recounted in the prologue of his book, Politics Lost.

The Landmark for Peace Memorial, installed in 1995 in the Dr. Martin Luther King Jr. Park near the site where the speech took place in Indianapolis, includes sculptures of King and Kennedy.

In 2018, the audio of the speech was selected by the Library of Congress for preservation in the National Recording Registry for being "culturally, historically, or aesthetically significant".

== Film ==
A Ripple of Hope, a documentary on the speech and the events surrounding it, was produced by Covenant Productions at Anderson University and released in 2008. It includes interviews with associates of Kennedy and members of the audience.

The speech was performed verbatim by Linus Roache in the 2002 film RFK.

== Works cited ==
- Murphy, John M. (June 5, 2009). ""A time of shame and sorrow": Robert F. Kennedy and the American jeremiad". Quarterly Journal of Speech. 76 (4): 401–414. doi:10.1080/00335639009383933.
