= 1975–76 Ball State Cardinals men's basketball team =

American college basketball season

1975–76 Ball State Cardinals men's basketball
- Conference: Mid-American Conference
- Record: 11–14 (5–11 Mid-American)
- Head coach: Jim Holstein
- Home arena: Irving Gymnasium

1975–76 Mid-American Conference men's basketball standings
| | Conf. | | | | Overall |
| Team | W | | L | PCT | W | | L | PCT |
|---|---|---|---|---|---|---|---|---|
| No. 10 Western Michigan | 15 | – | 1 | .938 | 25 | – | 3 | .893 |
| Miami (Ohio) | 14 | – | 2 | .875 | 18 | – | 8 | .692 |
| Toledo | 13 | – | 3 | .813 | 18 | – | 7 | .720 |
| Central Michigan | 8 | – | 8 | .500 | 12 | – | 14 | .462 |
| Bowling Green State | 8 | – | 8 | .500 | 12 | – | 15 | .444 |
| Kent State | 7 | – | 9 | .438 | 12 | – | 14 | .462 |
| Ohio | 7 | – | 9 | .438 | 11 | – | 15 | .423 |
| Ball State | 5 | – | 11 | .313 | 11 | – | 14 | .440 |
| Northern Illinois | 2 | – | 14 | .125 | 5 | – | 21 | .192 |
| Eastern Michigan | 1 | – | 15 | .063 | 7 | – | 20 | .259 |
Rankings from AP Poll

The 1975–76 Ball State Cardinals men's basketball team represented Ball State University as a member of the Mid-American Conference during the 1975–76 NCAA Division I men's basketball season.

== Roster ==
1975–76 Ball State Cardinals men's basketball team
Players
Coaches

| Pos. | # | Name | Height | Weight | Year | Hometown |
|---|---|---|---|---|---|---|
| C | 50 | Kim Arnett | 6 ft 9 in (2.06 m) | 220 lb (100 kg) | Sr | East Peoria, Illinois |
| F | 12 | Matt Beerbower | 6 ft 6 in (1.98 m) | 200 lb (91 kg) | So | Antwerp, Ohio |
| F | 44 | Larry Heinbaugh | 6 ft 8 in (2.03 m) | 220 lb (100 kg) | Sr | Fairfield, Ohio |

Head coach

- Jim Holstein

Assistant coach(es)

Legend

- (C) Team captain
- (S) Suspended
- (I) Ineligible
- (W) Walk-on
- Injured
- Current redshirt

Roster

== Schedule ==
| Date time, TV | Rank^{#} | Opponent^{#} | Result | Record | Site city, state |
|---|---|---|---|---|---|
| November 29* | | Indianapolis | W 71–61 | 1–0 | Irving Gymnasium; Muncie, Indiana |
| December 1* | | Wisconsin-Oshkosh | W 74–72 | 2–0 | Irving Gymnasium; Muncie, Indiana |
| December 6* | | Morehead State | W 85–82 | 3–0 | Irving Gymnasium; Muncie, Indiana |
| December 13* | | Indiana State | W 79–76 | 4–0 | Market Square Arena; Indianapolis, Indiana |
| December 17* | | Cleveland State | W 77–69 | 5–0 | Irving Gymnasium; Muncie, Indiana |
| December 20* | | at Butler | L 61–63 | 5–1 | Hinkle Fieldhouse; Indianapolis, Indiana |
| December 29* | | at Houston Baptist | L 76–81 | 5–2 | Frank and Lucille Sharp Gymnasium; Houston, Texas |
| January 3 | | Toledo | L 60–72 | 5–3 (0–1) | Irving Gymnasium; Muncie, Indiana |
| January 7 | | at Northern Illinois | W 74–72 | 6–3 (1–1) | Chick Evans Field House; DeKalb, Illinois |
| January 10 | | Kent State | L 66–72 | 6–4 (1–2) | Irving Gymnasium; Muncie, Indiana |
| January 14* | | at No. 15 Notre Dame | L 78–119 | 6–5 | Joyce Center; South Bend, IN |
| January 17 | | Ohio | L 74–75 | 6–6 (1–3) | Irving Gymnasium; Muncie, Indiana |
| January 21 | | at Miami (OH) | L 75–97 | 6–7 (1–4) | Millett Hall; Oxford, Ohio |
| January 24 | | Western Michigan | L 57–62 | 6–8 (1–5) | Irving Gymnasium; Muncie, Indiana |
| January 28 | | at Central Michigan | L 64–66 | 6–9 (1–6) | Rose Arena; Mount Pleasant, Michigan |
| January 31 | | Bowling Green State | W 77–53 | 7–9 (2–6) | Irving Gymnasium; Muncie, Indiana |
| February 2* | | Bulter | W 66–63 | 8–9 | Irving Gymnasium; Muncie, Indiana |
| February 7 | | at Eastern Michigan | W 84–78 | 9–9 (3–6) | Bowen Field House; Ypsilanti, Michigan |
| February 11 | | Northern Illinois | L 77–79 | 9–10 (3–7) | Irving Gymnasium; Muncie, Indiana |
| February 14 | | at Kent State | W 75–61 | 10–10 (4–7) | Memorial Athletic and Convocation Center; Kent, Ohio |
| February 21 | | at Ohio | L 63–90 | 10–11 (4–8) | Convocation Center; Athens, Ohio |
| February 25 | | Miami (OH) | L 63–81 | 10–12 (4–9) | Irving Gymnasium; Muncie, Indiana |
| February 28 | | at No. 16 Western Michigan | L 67–93 | 10–13 (4–10) | University Arena; Kalamazoo, Michigan |
| March 3 | | Central Michigan | W 76–63 | 11–13 (5–10) | Irving Gymnasium; Muncie, Indiana |
| March 6 | | at Toledo | L 66–91 | 11–14 (5–11) | The Field House; Toledo, Ohio |
*Non-conference game. ^{#}Rankings from AP Poll. (#) Tournament seedings in parentheses.
