= Stuart Loory =

American journalist and educator

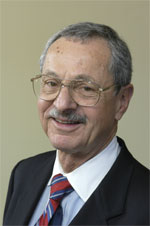
Loory in 2009

Stuart Hugh Loory (May 22, 1932 – January 16, 2015) was an American journalist and educator.

== Early and education ==
Loory was born in Wilson, Pennsylvania, on May 22, 1932. He grew up in Dover, New Jersey, where his parents, Harry and Eve Loory, owned a large furniture store. Along with his younger brother, Melvyn, he attended prep school at Blair Academy. In 1954, Loory graduated from Cornell University, where he was a member of the Quill and Dagger society and editor-in-chief of The Cornell Daily Sun. After three years at the Newark News, he received a Master's degree in journalism from Columbia University in 1958, and did postgraduate work in Vienna, Austria.

== Career ==
=== Newspaper journalism ===
Starting in 1959, he worked at the New York Herald Tribune as a reporter, science writer (1961–63), a Washington correspondent (1963–64), and a Moscow-based foreign correspondent (1964–66). He worked briefly as a science writer for The New York Times in 1966, then as a White House correspondent for Los Angeles Times (1967–71), earning a place on President Nixon's "Enemies List." In 1968, Lorry and "David Kraslow of the Washington Bureau of the Los Angeles Times won the Raymond Clapper Memorial Award for the best Washington correspondent of the year."

In January 1971, after Loory wrote about taxpayer expenses involved with Nixon's San Clemente, California and Key Biscayne, Florida vacation homes, Loory was summarily banned from the White House.

=== Broadcast journalism ===
Loory was a fellow at Woodrow Wilson Center, 1971–72, and in 1973 executive editor for WNBC-TV news. He was the first Kiplinger Professor of Public Affairs Reporting at Ohio State University, 1973–75. He became associate and, later, managing editor of Chicago Sun-Times in 1975.

In 1980, he joined the staff of Turner Broadcasting Systems' Cable News Network (as managing editor of the Washington bureau, 1980–82; Moscow bureau chief, 1983–86; senior correspondent, 1986; executive producer, 1987–90; editor-in-chief of CNN World Report, 1990–91; vice-president of CNN, 1990–95; executive vice-president, Turner International Broadcasting, Russia, 1993–97).

=== Academia ===
Since 1997, has been the first Lee Hills Chair in Free-Press Studies at the University of Missouri in Columbia, Missouri. He was editor of Global Journalist, a quarterly magazine of interest to journalists in 127 countries and moderator of Global Journalist on KBIA-FM radio, a National Public Radio affiliate in Columbia, Missouri. Loory retired from MU in the summer of 2010.

== Books ==
- The Secret Search for Peace in Vietnam (1968, with David Kraslow)
- Defeated: Inside America's Military Machine (1973)
- Seven Days That Shook the World: The Collapse of Soviet Communism (1991, with Ann Isme)

== Personal life ==
Loory married Marjorie Dretel of Morristown, New Jersey in 1955 with whom he had three children: Joshua, Adam, and Miriam. They divorced in the early 1990s.

In the mid-1990s, Stuart met Nina Kudriavtseva while hosting Ted Turner and Jane Fonda in the Czar's Box at Bolshoi Theatre. They married in 1995 and now live in Brooklyn, New York City. Nina travels to Moscow many times a year to visit her family there from a previous marriage, and as artistic director of Benois De La Danse, the international ballet awards. Stuart has two grandchildren from his first son Joshua and his wife Fern Hoppenstand: Matthew Loory and Ilana. From his daughter Miriam, married to Daniel Krombach, he has: Leah, Joseph, Benjamin, and Jonathan. From his second marriage, he has two grandchildren: Kostya (Konstantin) and Areseniy (Arsen). Both of his Russian half grandchildren come from two marriages of his stepson, Lyoka (Leonid).

== Death ==
On January 16, 2015, Loory died of lung cancer in Brooklyn.

== See also ==
- Afghanistanism
