= Politics Lost =

- Author: Joe Klein
- Language: English
- Publisher: Doubleday and Broadway Books
- Publication date: April 18, 2006, and June 19, 2007
- Publication place: United States
- Media type: Hardcover and softcover
- Pages: 272 (hard and soft)

Politics Lost: How American Democracy Was Trivialized By People Who Think You're Stupid, reprinted in 2007 as Politics Lost: From RFK to W: How Politicians Have Become Less Courageous and More Interested in Keeping Power than in Doing What's Right for America, is a 2006 book by journalist Joe Klein on the loss of spontaneity and authenticity in American politics. The book begins by recounting Robert F. Kennedy's 1968 speech on the assassination of Martin Luther King, which Klein says "marked the end of an era" before polling and consultants took over public life; he then covers all of the U.S. presidential elections from 1976 to 2004.
