= J. Wayne Fredericks =

American diplomat

- J. Wayne Fredericks in United States Air Force uniform, 1942

Deputy Assistant Secretary of State for African Affairs
- In office 1961–1967

Personal details
- Born: February 26, 1917 Wakarusa, Indiana, U.S.
- Died: August 18, 2004 (aged 87) Bronxville, New York, U.S.
- Party: Democratic
- Spouse: Anne Curtis
- Children: 2
- Education: Purdue University

Jacob Wayne Fredericks (1917–2004) was an American businessman and diplomat who served as the United States Deputy Assistant Secretary of State for African Affairs from 1961 until 1967. His corporate work included positions at Kellogg's, Chase Manhattan Bank, and the Ford Motor Company. Fredericks was also at times a chief member of the Ford Foundation, vice president of the Overseas Development Council, and director of the Foreign Policy Association.

== Personal life ==
Jacob Wayne Fredericks was born on February 26, 1917, in Wakarusa, Indiana. He had a brother and a sister. In 1952, he married Anne Curtis and had two children, William and Maria.

Fredericks suffered a stroke on 16 August 2004. he died two days later in a hospital in Bronxville, New York. Archbishop Desmond Tutu spoke at his memorial service, honoring his involvement in South Africa during his tenure at the State Department.

== Career ==
Fredericks graduated from Purdue University in 1938 with a degree in civil engineering. In 1940, he enlisted in the United States Army Air Forces. During World War II, he served in the European and Far East theatres, flying the maximum allowed 50 bomber missions in a Boeing B-17 Flying Fortress. He later acted as a liaison officer to the Royal Air Force, retiring with the Legion of Merit, Distinguished Flying Cross, Bronze Star, Order of the British Empire and Croix de Guerre honors.

In the late 1940s, Fredericks went to South Africa to help construct a Kellogg's cereal plant. Fredericks was called back into service with the United States Air Force during the Korean War. He focused on strategic planning under General Curtis E. LeMay, working closely with the CIA. After the war he resumed his work with Kellogg's until 1956. He subsequently joined the Ford Foundation and was associate director of its overseas development programs for South and Southeast Asia.

Fredericks was involved in John F. Kennedy's successful presidential campaign in 1960.

In May 1961, he was appointed as Deputy Assistant Secretary of State for African Affairs with the help of his friend, former Michigan Governor and Assistant Secretary G. Mennen Williams, often acting as a liaison with African liberation groups. He was heavily involved in American policy during the Congo Crisis that led to the downfall of the State of Katanga. In the Spring of 1966, he convinced Senator Robert F. Kennedy to travel to South Africa to give his Day of Affirmation Address. Fredericks was also responsible for drafting a speech given by President Lyndon B. Johnson on 26 May at the reception marking the third anniversary of the Organization of African Unity. He briefly served as acting Assistant Secretary when Williams left his post until Joseph Palmer II took his place. He retired from the State Department in 1967, and received the Distinguished Honor Award for his work.

After his political career, Frederick's held many corporate positions. He returned to the Ford Foundation and directed its Middle East and Africa programs until 1974. After that and through most of the 1980s he was a vice president for international affairs at Chase Manhattan Bank. From 1973-,1985 he was executive director of the international governmental affairs division of the Ford Motor Company. During the 1,980s Fredericks was also a vice chairman of the now-defunct Overseas Development Council.

In 1994, Fredericks became director of the Foreign Policy Association, a position he held until his death.
