= Robert F. Kennedy's speech at Ball State University =

1968 speech by U.S. Senator Robert F. Kennedy

- Date: April 4, 1968
- Duration: 34 minutes
- Venue: Men's Gym; Ball State University
- Location: Muncie, Indiana; 40°12′19″N 85°24′21″W
- Type: Speech

Robert F. Kennedy's speech at Ball State University was given on April 4, 1968, in Muncie, Indiana.

== Background ==
On March 16, 1968, Robert F. Kennedy declared his candidacy for president of the United States. On March 28, he flew into Weir Cook Airport in Indianapolis to file as a presidential candidate in the Indiana primary.

On April 4, Kennedy made his first campaign speech in Indiana at University of Notre Dame, entitled "Feeding America's Hungry." Kennedy then went on to Muncie, Indiana. The landing strip at Delaware County Regional Airport was too small for his campaign's plane, so he had to take a smaller aircraft to Muncie while most of his staff and the accompanying press continued to Indianapolis.

Kennedy stepped off of his chartered Convair at 5:40 PM on April 4, about a half an hour behind schedule. He quickly embarked on a red convertible with his wife, Ethel, driving two miles to Ball State University.

The Ball State appearance had been arranged by Earl Conn, an assistant professor at the university's journalism department. He was aided by campaign staffer Bill Foley and a local attorney and former 10th District coordinator for John F. Kennedy's presidential campaign, Marshall Hanley. In preparation for the speech Foley had considered using both Emens Auditorium and the men's gym as a venue. Foley was reluctant to use the gym because he was worried it couldn't be adequately filled. Only when he was assured that the second level could be curtained off, did he agree to make use of it.

== The speech ==
The men's gym was completely filled with 10,000-12,000 students, contrary to Foley's initial concerns about a small audience.

On stage Kennedy was accompanied by his wife, Delaware County Democratic county chairman Robert Stewart, former vice county chairman Armena Rahe, Mayor Paul Cooley, and Marshall Hanley. After an introduction by Hanley, Kennedy spoke for 34 minutes.

=== Summary ===
Kennedy opened with a joke about his brother, Senator Ted Kennedy, supposedly trying to enter the campaign after President Johnson's withdrawal. He proceeded to talk about more serious issues. Kennedy told the audience that with the Vietnam War "on the way to being settled," (Note: With Johnson no longer in the race and with a temporary pause on bombing, the Vietnam War wasn't as pressing of a matter at the time of the speech.) they needed to ask themselves "What kind of help and how much should we give to the underdeveloped nations of the world?"

Concerning domestic poverty, he said "What kind of programs can we develop to build a better America here at home for people who live lives of desperation?" Kennedy suggested that if America could invest millions in developing a supersonic jet, then it "can afford to feed the hungry children of the state of Mississippi." (Note: Kennedy had personally toured impoverished parts of the Mississippi Delta in 1967 and observed children suffering from malnutrition.) He mentioned how seven out of ten children in Latin America die before their tenth birthday and in Africa many suffered from disease. Kennedy said of them, "These men and women and children we hear about and that I'm talking about here, they're not statistics, they are human beings whom I have seen...each with a right to live a life of dignity and purpose just as much as you and I have." Kennedy highlighted the responsibility of the American people for this poverty and for the Vietnam War.

Kennedy utilized many fillers and paused frequently during his speech.

=== Student questions ===
The senator subsequently spent 21 minutes answering questions presented by the audience. The first of which came from a skeptical student who accused him of "telling jokes" and "double talking" without promising any specific solutions. The crowd erupted in boos. Kennedy noted, "He's perfectly entitled to disagree with me and that's the only way were going to make progress in this country-if people stand up and speak their minds."

Kennedy discussed a potential tax credit program that would encourage businesses to invest in areas suffering from high unemployment. He called the draft "inequitable and unfair" and opposed student deferrals, instead supporting an impartial lottery system.

One of the twenty black students in the auditorium asked, “Your speech implies that you are placing a great deal of faith in white America. Is that faith justified?” Kennedy answered, “Yes” and added that “faith in Black America is justified, too” although he said there “are extremists on both sides.”

== Aftermath ==
It has been argued that although the speech has been largely overlooked and ignored, due to the assassination of Martin Luther King Jr., it was one of the most powerful and heartfelt ones Kennedy delivered.

From Muncie, the Kennedy entourage flew back to Indianapolis that night where Robert F. Kennedy delivered what many call his greatest speech, announcing the Martin Luther King Jr. assassination to a predominantly African-American audience. Discarding the themes of his earlier speeches, Kennedy addressed the crowd for six minutes, speaking entirely about King’s death and its meaning for the nation and the world, ending by asking for prayers for King, his family, and “for our country.”

On May 7, 1968, Kennedy won Indiana’s Democratic primary with 42% of the vote compared to 31% for Indiana Governor Roger D. Branigin and 27% for Eugene McCarthy. Kennedy’s trip to Muncie had a positive impact on Delaware County voters, as he received 40% of the votes cast in the county.
