= 1975–76 Ohio Bobcats men's basketball team =

American college basketball season

1975–76 Ohio Bobcats men's basketball
- Conference: Mid-American Conference
- Record: 11–15 (7–9 MAC)
- Head coach: Dale Bandy (2nd season)
- Assistant coach: Bill Brown (2nd season)
- Home arena: Convocation Center

1975–76 Mid-American Conference men's basketball standings
| | Conf. | | | | Overall |
| Team | W | | L | PCT | W | | L | PCT |
|---|---|---|---|---|---|---|---|---|
| No. 10 Western Michigan | 15 | – | 1 | .938 | 25 | – | 3 | .893 |
| Miami (Ohio) | 14 | – | 2 | .875 | 18 | – | 8 | .692 |
| Toledo | 13 | – | 3 | .813 | 18 | – | 7 | .720 |
| Central Michigan | 8 | – | 8 | .500 | 12 | – | 14 | .462 |
| Bowling Green State | 8 | – | 8 | .500 | 12 | – | 15 | .444 |
| Kent State | 7 | – | 9 | .438 | 12 | – | 14 | .462 |
| Ohio | 7 | – | 9 | .438 | 11 | – | 15 | .423 |
| Ball State | 5 | – | 11 | .313 | 11 | – | 14 | .440 |
| Northern Illinois | 2 | – | 14 | .125 | 5 | – | 21 | .192 |
| Eastern Michigan | 1 | – | 15 | .063 | 7 | – | 20 | .259 |
Rankings from AP Poll

The 1975–76 Ohio Bobcats men's basketball team represented Ohio University as a member of the Mid-American Conference in the college basketball season of 1975–76. The team was coached by Dale Bandy in his second season at Ohio. They played their home games at Convocation Center. The Bobcats finished with a record of 11–15 and seventh in the MAC regular season with a conference record of 7–9.

== Schedule ==
| Date time, TV | Rank^{#} | Opponent^{#} | Result | Record | Site (attendance) city, state |
Regular Season
| 11/28/1975* | | vs. Massachusetts; Hall of Fame Tournament | L 82–95 | 0–1 | |
| 11/29/1975* | | vs. Fairfield; Hall of Fame Tournament | L 76–78 | 0–2 | |
| 12/3/1975* | | Marietta | W 59–56 | 1–2 | |
| 12/6/1975* | | at Northwestern | L 62–86 | 1–3 | Welsh–Ryan Arena; Evanston, Illinois |
| 12/13/1975* | | at Pittsburgh | L 71–72 | 1–4 | |
| 12/20/1975* | | Cleveland State | W 100–69 | 2–4 | |
| 12/30/1975* | | Otterbein | W 76–67 | 3–4 | |
MAC regular season
| 1/3/1976 | | Central Michigan | W 84–74 | 4–4 (1–0) | |
| 1/10/1976 | | Bowling Green | W 62–56 | 5–4 (2–0) | |
| 1/14/1976* | | Marshall | W 74–60 | 6–4 | |
| 1/17/1976 | | at Ball State | W 75–74 | 7–4 (3–0) | |
| 1/21/1976 | | Eastern Michigan | W 74–66 | 8–4 (4–0) | |
| 1/24/1976 | | at Miami (OH) | L 63–86 | 8–5 (4–1) | |
| 1/28/1976 | | Toledo | L 75–79 | 8–6 (4–2) | |
| 1/31/1976 | | at Western Michigan | L 59–75 | 8-7 (4-3) | |
| 2/2/1976* | | Loyola (IL) | L 82–86 ^{OT} | 8-8 | |
| 2/4/1976* | | at No. 19 Virginia Tech | L 66–86 | 8–9 | |
| 2/7/1976 | | Northern Illinois | W 90–79 | 9–9 (5–3) | |
| 2/11/1976 | | Kent State | L 67–70 | 9–10 (5–4) | |
| 2/14/1976 | | at Bowling Green | L 60–67 | 9–11 (5–5) | |
| 2/18/1976 | | at Kent State | L 75–105 | 9–12 (5–6) | |
| 2/21/1976 | | Ball State | W 90–63 | 10–12 (6–6) | |
| 2/25/1976 | | at Eastern Michigan | W 78–75 | 11–12 (7–6) | |
| 2/28/1976 | | Miami (OH) | L 75–76 | 11–13 (7–7) | |
| 3/3/1976 | | at Toledo | L 72–87 | 11–14 (7–8) | |
| 3/6/1976 | | at Central Michigan | L 99–114 | 11–15 (7–9) | |
*Non-conference game. ^{#}Rankings from AP Poll. (#) Tournament seedings in parentheses. All times are in Eastern Time.

== Statistics ==
=== Team statistics ===
Final 1975–76 statistics

| Record | Ohio | OPP |
|---|---|---|
| Scoring | 1948 | 2001 |
| Scoring Average | 74.92 | 76.96 |
| Field goals – Att | 768–1705 | 806–1678 |
| Free throws – Att | 412–534 | 389–544 |
| Rebounds | 999 | 1088 |
| Assists | | |
| Turnovers | | |
| Steals | | |
| Blocked Shots | | |

=== Player statistics ===
| | | | Minutes | | Scoring | | Total FGs | | | Free-Throws | | | Rebounds | | | | | | |
| Player | GP | GS | Tot | Avg | Pts | Avg | FG | FGA | Pct | FT | FTA | Pct | Tot | Avg | A | PF | TO | Stl | Blk |
|---|---|---|---|---|---|---|---|---|---|---|---|---|---|---|---|---|---|---|---|
| Scott Love | 25 | - | | | 393 | 15.7 | 140 | 298 | 0.470 | 113 | 133 | 0.850 | 212 | 8.5 | | 76 | | | |
| Steve Skaggs | 26 | - | | | 300 | 11.5 | 117 | 261 | 0.448 | 66 | 81 | 0.815 | 79 | 3.0 | | 42 | | | |
| Mike Corde | 26 | - | | | 292 | 11.2 | 123 | 245 | 0.502 | 46 | 62 | 0.742 | 74 | 2.8 | | 88 | | | |
| Chuck Seltzer | 26 | - | | | 254 | 9.8 | 104 | 241 | 0.432 | 46 | 75 | 0.613 | 132 | 5.1 | | 84 | | | |
| Dave Terek | 26 | - | | | 228 | 8.8 | 88 | 209 | 0.421 | 52 | 68 | 0.765 | 130 | 5.0 | | 73 | | | |
| Bucky Walden | 26 | - | | | 225 | 8.7 | 88 | 210 | 0.419 | 49 | 61 | 0.803 | 82 | 3.2 | | 69 | | | |
| Doug Jauch | 17 | - | | | 72 | 4.8 | 32 | 67 | 0.478 | 8 | 14 | 0.571 | 32 | 1.5 | | 26 | | | |
| Cliff Sawyer | 22 | - | | | 63 | 4.2 | 27 | 63 | 0.429 | 9 | 15 | 0.600 | 25 | 1.9 | | 25 | | | |
| Phil Miller | 17 | - | | | 56 | 3.3 | 25 | 50 | 0.500 | 6 | 6 | 1.000 | 24 | 1.4 | | 18 | | | |
| Greg Cobb | 8 | - | | | 38 | 2.9 | 15 | 34 | 0.441 | 8 | 8 | 1.000 | 12 | 1.1 | | 15 | | | |
| Bob Leon | 18 | - | | | 25 | 2.0 | 8 | 25 | 0.320 | 9 | 11 | 0.818 | 11 | 2.0 | | 15 | | | |
| Mike Borden | 1 | - | | | 2 | 1.4 | 1 | 2 | 0.500 | 0 | 0 | 0.000 | 2 | 0.6 | | 0 | | | |
| Total | 26 | - | - | - | 1948 | 74.9 | 768 | 1705 | 0.450 | 412 | 534 | 0.772 | 999 | 38.4 | | 541 | | | |
| Opponents | 26 | - | - | - | 2001 | 77.0 | 806 | 1678 | 0.480 | 389 | 544 | 0.715 | 1088 | 41.8 | | 518 | | | |

Legend
| GP | Games played | GS | Games started | Avg | Average per game |
| FG | Field-goals made | FGA | Field-goal attempts | Off | Offensive rebounds |
| Def | Defensive rebounds | A | Assists | TO | Turnovers |
| Blk | Blocks | Stl | Steals | High | Team high |
