= Irving Gymnasium =

Former athletics facility in Muncie, Indiana, U.S.

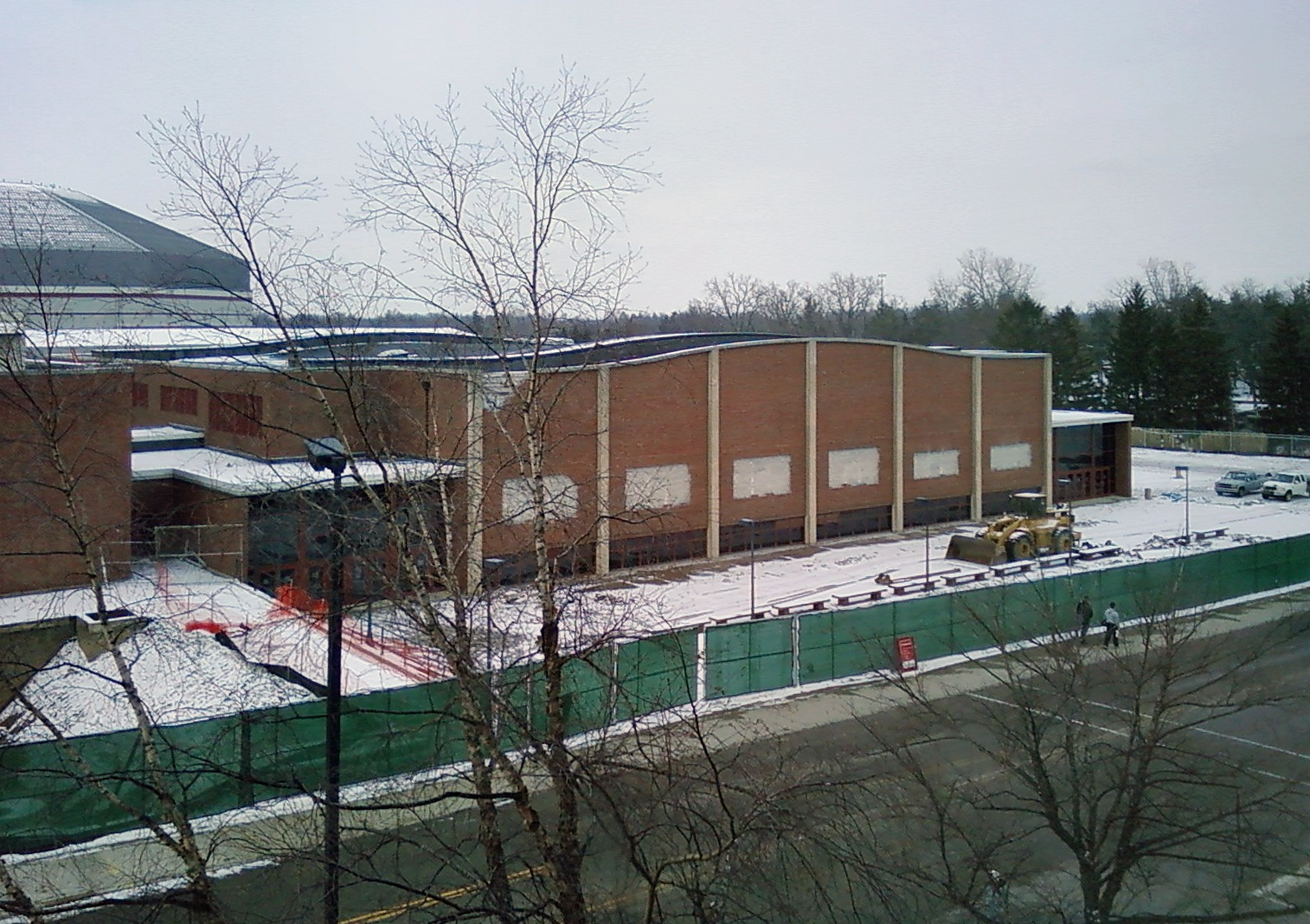
- Irving Gym during Deconstruction

- Location within Indiana

General information
- Type: Physical fitness facility
- Location: Ball State University; Corner of Neely & McKinley Avenue; Muncie, IN 47306
- Coordinates: 40°12′19″N 85°24′21″W
- Named for: Irving Family (Irving Brothers Sand and Gravel)
- Completed: 1962
- Demolished: 2009

Design and construction
- Architects: Walter Scholar & Associates; Lafayette, Indiana

Other information
- Seating capacity: 4,200

Irving Gymnasium was an indoor athletics facility on the campus of Ball State University in Muncie, Indiana, USA. Opened in 1962 with a capacity of 6,600 spectators, it hosted primarily Ball State Cardinals basketball and volleyball games until Worthen Arena opened in 1992. It hosted the 1972 and 1976 NCAA Men's Volleyball Championship games.

In 2008, Irving Gymnasium closed to undergo renovations for the new Student Recreation and Wellness Center. The Student Recreation and Wellness Center opened in 2010 and offers 5 basketball courts, an indoor turf building for indoor football and soccer, a rock climbing wall, an expanded weight lifting and cardio equipment space, an 1/8 suspended walking/jogging track, a Quiznos and space devoted to yoga and martial arts.

== Notable appearances ==
Presidential hopeful Robert F. Kennedy spoke in Irving Gymnasium on April 4, 1968, to a crowd of 12,000 people, almost double the seating capacity. The university had only 7,000 seats to offer, which left 5,000 students to stand during Kennedy's half-hour speech. A little over an hour after his speech, on the way to another campaign stop in Indianapolis, Kennedy learned of Martin Luther King Jr.'s assassination.

President Barack Obama made a stop in Irving Gymnasium on April 12, 2008, on his campaign trail, 40 years and one week after Kennedy's 1968 speech there.
