= Afghanistanism =

Focusing on faraway issues over local

Afghanistan, on the other side of the world from North America

Afghanistanism is a term, first recorded in the United States, for the practice of concentrating on problems in distant parts of the world while ignoring controversial local issues. In other contexts, the term has referred to "hopelessly arcane and irrelevant scholarship", "fascination with exotic, faraway lands", or "Railing and shaking your fist at an unseen foe who is quite unaware of your existence, much less your fury".

== Origin ==
The Oxford English Dictionary lists Afghanistanism as a U.S. colloquialism; the first written citation it provides is from 1948: J. Lloyd Jones in Probl. Journalism (American Society of Newspaper Editors Convention) 73, "I don't wish to belabor this subject of Afghanistanism, this business of taking forthright stands on elections in Costa Rica, while the uncollected local garbage reeks beneath the editor's window."

Robert H. Stopher and James S. Jackson, writing in their April 1948 column "Behind the Front Page", said the "new term" was coined by Jenkin Lloyd Jones of Oklahoma's Tulsa Tribune at that same convention, in Washington, D.C. They quoted Jones as saying:

The tragic fact is that many an editorial writer can't hit a short-range target. He's hell on distance. He can pontificate about the situation in Afghanistan with perfect safety. It takes more guts to dig up the dirt on the sheriff.

But columnist Joe Klein wrote in Time magazine in 2010 that the term originated in the 19th century when "the British press defined Afghanistanism as the obsession with obscure foreign wars at the expense of domestic priorities", adding that "Afghanistanism seems likely to become a national debate [in the United States] before long: "Is building roads and police stations in Afghanistan more important than doing so at home?"

== Applications ==
The concept earlier came to have several applications. On one hand it was applied in North American journalism to newspaper articles about faraway places that were irrelevant to local readers. Other writers said, though, that Afghanistanism was the tendency of some editors to avoid hard local news by writing opinion pieces about events happening in distant lands. As New York Times writer James Reston put it about journalists, "Like officials in Washington, we suffer from Afghanistanism. If it's far away, it's news, but if it's close to home, it's sociology."

Earlier, educator Robert M. Hutchins used the expression in a speech at the California Institute of Technology in 1955:

Afghanistanism, as you know, is the practice of referring always to some remote country, place, person or problem when there is something that ought to be taken care of near at home that is very acute. So you say to a professor at Caltech, "What about smog?" and he says, "Have you heard about the crisis in Afghanistan?"

In 1973, the concept was adapted to reporting on environmentalism, which was said by journalism researchers Steven E. Hungerford and James B. Lemert to deal with environmental problems of distant communities rather than local ones. This observation was echoed in 2004 by B.A. Taleb, who called it "displacing the [environmental] problems and issues to other places and ignoring their existence in one's own community or country".

== Resurfacing ==
After the attacks on the World Trade Center in New York City on September 11, 2001, the concept resurfaced, with some writers asserting that it was no longer applicable to contemporary events. For example, Stuart H. Loory, chair in Free-Press Studies at the University of Missouri School of Journalism, wrote on December 1, 2001:

A primary mission of the news business is to work as a distant early warning signal of impending problems for the public and those who can deal with those problems. It must work in a convincing way, and that means news organizations must train and educate journalists to work in various parts of the world knowledgably. They cannot fit the image now in vogue — that of parachutists jumping into an area to cover disaster on short notice. That perpetuates "Afghanistanism," a concept that has long since outlived its usefulness, if it ever had any at all.

== See also ==
- American exceptionalism
- Media bias
- Psychological projection
- Somebody else's problem
- Whataboutism, a more general deflection in American political discourse
