= Joe Klein =

American journalist (born 1946)

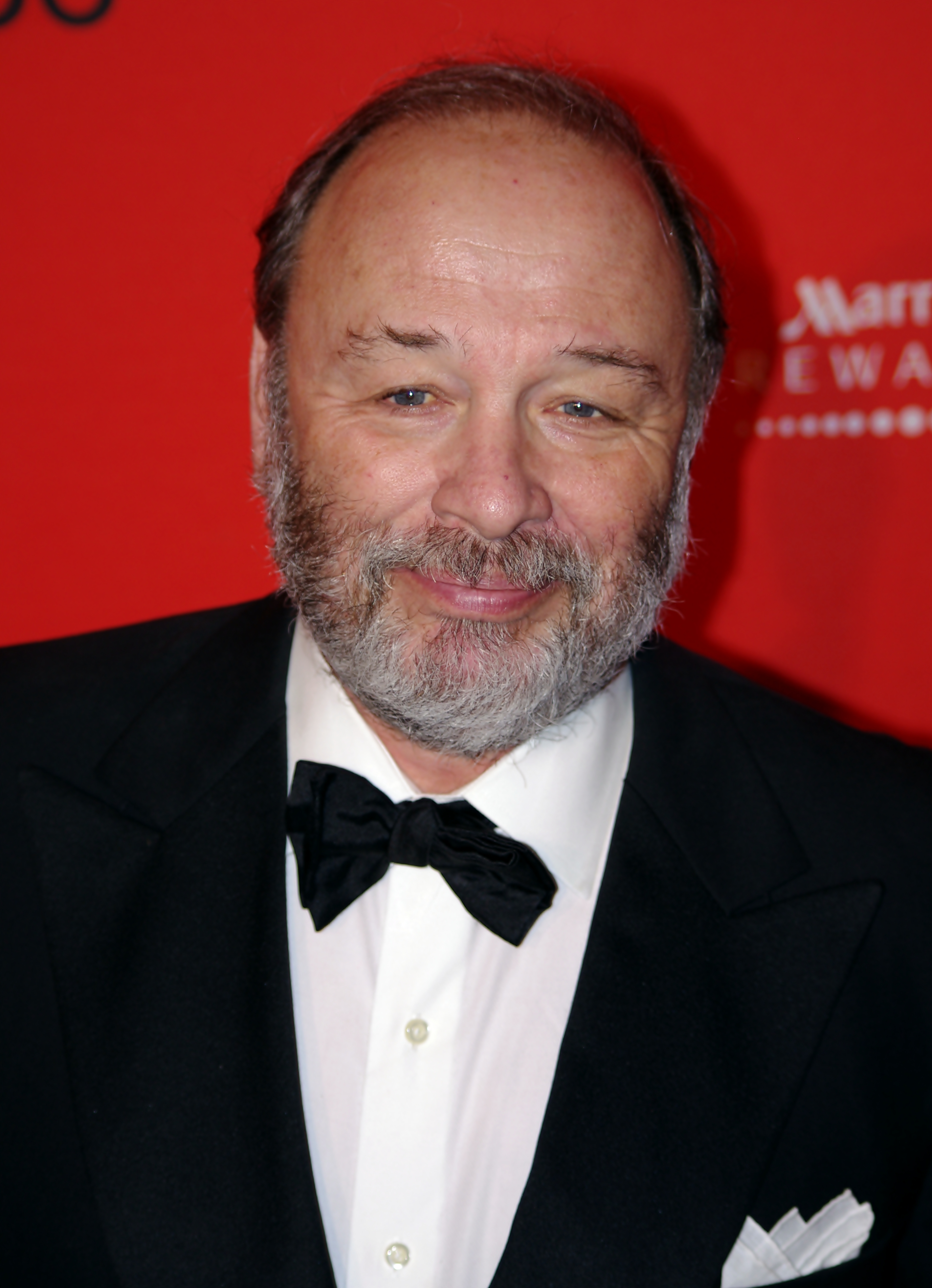
- Klein at the 2011 Time 100 Gala
- Born: September 7, 1946 (age 80); New York City, New York, U.S.
- Education: Hackley School; University of Pennsylvania
- Occupations: Columnist; author
- Spouse(s): Janet Eklund (m. 1967–1975) Victoria Kaunitz
- Children: 4
- Writing career
- Period: 1969–present
- Subject: American politics

Joe Klein (born September 7, 1946) is an American political commentator and author. He is best known for his work as a columnist for Time magazine and his novel Primary Colors, an anonymously written roman à clef portraying Bill Clinton's 1992 presidential campaign. Klein was a member of the Council on Foreign Relations and is a former Guggenheim Fellow. In April 2006 he published Politics Lost, a book on what he calls the "pollster–consultant industrial complex." He has also written articles and book reviews for The New Republic, The New York Times, The Washington Post, Life, and Rolling Stone.

== Early life and career ==
Klein was born in Rockaway Beach, Queens, the son of Miram (née Warshauer) and John Klein, a printer. His maternal grandfather was professional musician Frank Warshauer. He has referred to his heritage as Jewish.

Klein graduated from the Hackley School and the University of Pennsylvania with a degree in American civilization. In 1969 Klein began reporting for the Essex County Newspapers, and The Peabody Times in Peabody, Massachusetts. In 1972 he reported for Boston's WGBH, and until 1974 he was also the news editor for The Real Paper in Cambridge, Massachusetts. He was a contributing editor for Rolling Stone from 1975 to 1980, and Washington bureau chief from 1975 to 1977. He became friends with actor-director Tom Laughlin after interviewing him for Rolling Stone and appeared briefly as a reporter in Laughlin's 1977 film Billy Jack Goes to Washington.

Klein published Woody Guthrie: A Life in 1980 and Payback: Five Marines After Vietnam in 1984. He was a political columnist for New York from 1987 to 1992, winning the Peter Kihss Award for his reporting on the 1989 race for mayor of New York. In May 1992 he joined Newsweek and wrote the column "Public Lives," which won a National Headliner Award in 1994. Newsweek also won a National Magazine Award for their coverage of Bill Clinton's 1992 victory. From 1992 to 1996 he was also a consultant for CBS News, providing commentary.

== Primary Colors ==
In January 1996, Klein anonymously published the novel Primary Colors: A Novel of Politics, based on the 1992 Democratic presidential primary. The book spent nine weeks as number one on the New York Times bestseller list, with its author listed as "Anonymous." Several people, including former Clinton speechwriter David Kusnet and, later, Vassar professor Donald Foster correctly identified Klein as the novel's author, based on a literary analysis of the book and Klein's previous writing. Klein denied writing the book and publicly condemned Foster. Klein denied authorship again in Newsweek, speculating that another writer wrote it. Washington Post Style editor David Von Drehle, in an interview, asked Klein if he was willing to stake his journalistic credibility on his denial, to which Klein agreed. On July 17, 1996, Klein admitted that the speculation had been correct.

== Later career ==
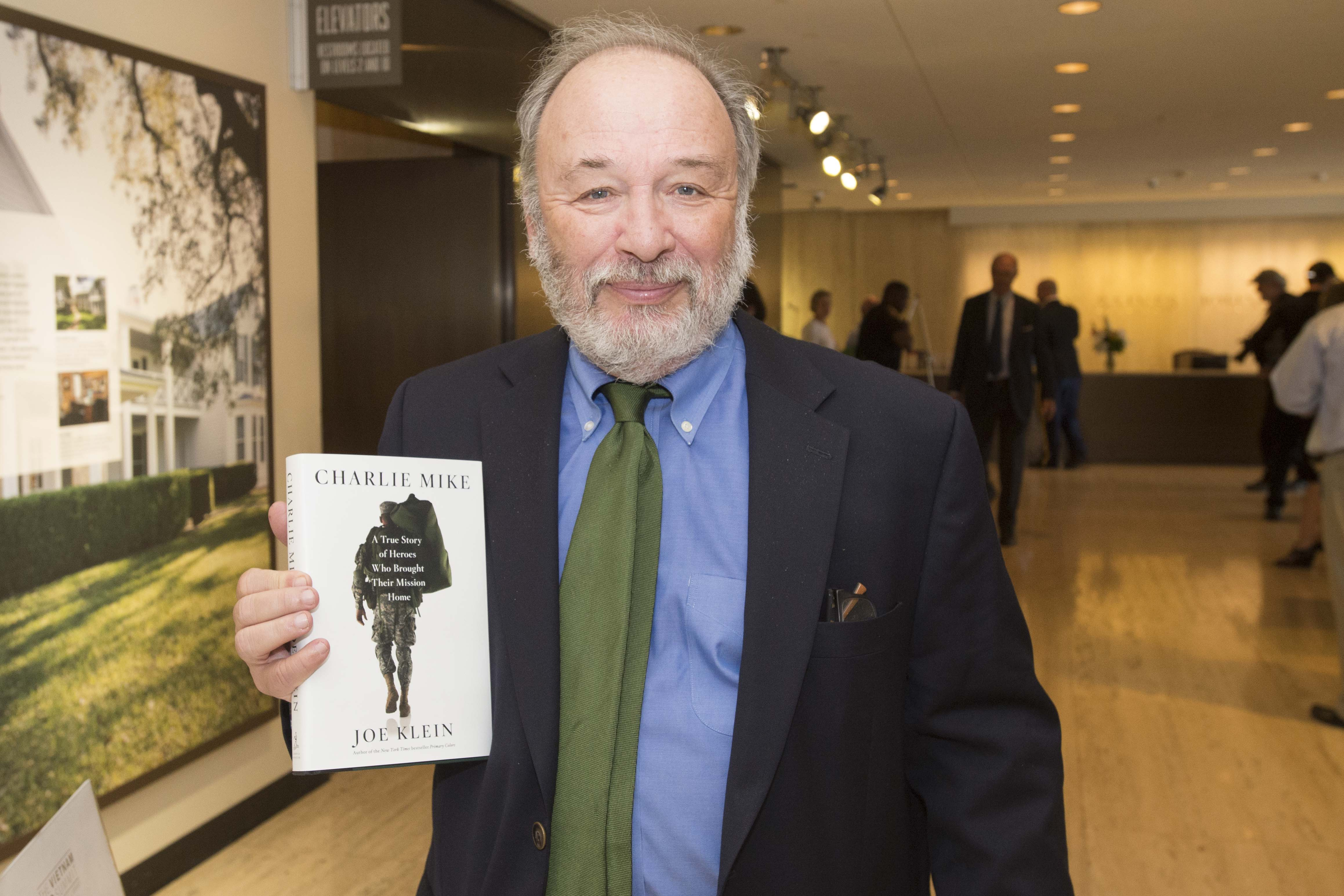
Klein at the LBJ Presidential Library in 2016

In December 1996 he joined The New Yorker to write the Letter from Washington column. In 2000 he published The Running Mate, a sequel of sorts to Primary Colors. In March 2002 Klein published The Natural: Bill Clinton's Misunderstood Presidency, an account of Clinton's two terms in office.

In January 2003, he joined Time to write a column called In the Arena on national and international affairs. It appears in Time's upfront Notebook section and has been criticized for its reporting about then–minority leader Nancy Pelosi and the Democratic opposition to warrantless wiretapping. The column has been the source of several retractions by Time.

Klein was a regular blogger on time.com's now-defunct Swampland blog. In November 2007, Salon columnist Glenn Greenwald wrote about what he alleged were factual errors in a Klein story about the Foreign Intelligence Surveillance Act (FISA). Klein reported that the Democratic version of the FISA bill "would require the surveillance of every foreign-terrorist target's calls to be approved by the FISA court" and that it, therefore "would give terrorists the same legal protections as Americans." Time later published a comment: "In the original version of this story, Joe Klein wrote that the House Democratic version of the Foreign Intelligence Surveillance Act (FISA) would allow a court review of individual foreign surveillance targets. Republicans believe the bill can be interpreted that way, but Democrats don't." Greenwald noted that the text of the legislation does not require court review of individual targets, and that Time's response disregards this fact. Klein's response was, "I have neither the time nor legal background to figure out who's right."

Later, Greenwald reported that Time "refused the requests of two sitting members of Congress ... to correct Klein's false statements in Time itself." Greenwald has reported that Senator Russ Feingold has been informed by Time that his letter rebutting Klein will be published in a forthcoming issue.

In October 2012 Klein was criticized by Glenn Greenwald for revealing on MSNBC's Morning Joe program his advocacy of U.S. drone strikes. Klein dismissed child deaths caused by drones in the countries where they are operating, stating that the bottom line, in the end, was to ask "whose 4-year-olds get killed? What we're doing is limiting the possibility that 4-year-olds here will get killed by indiscriminate acts of terror."

In a June 2013 cover story for Time magazine, Klein reported on Oklahoma tornado relief, but came under fire for implying secular humanists did not help deliver aid. Klein later clarified he only meant to refer to "organized" secular humanist groups, a claim that was also contested and called inaccurate.

In October 2014 Klein traveled to Tuscaloosa, Alabama, for his article in Time magazine titled "Shut down in Tuscaloosa." Klein interviewed a small number of academics from the University of Alabama. Klein's article came under fire from the focus group he interviewed due to allegations of misquotes, improper citations, and wrong names used in the interview.

== Political views ==
In the 1990s, Klein wrote an influential cover story for Newsweek defining and, to some extent, defending radical centrism, "Stalking the Radical Middle." He said radical-middle activism was fueling "what is becoming a significant intellectual movement, nothing less than an attempt to replace the traditional notions of liberalism and conservatism." Some of Klein's later journalism is in that same vein.

In The Natural, his book about the Clinton presidency, Klein gave a mixed assessment of Clinton's time in office. In the book, he wrote: "The conventions of journalism prevent me from fitting too neatly into one political niche (although as a columnist for the New Yorker and Newsweek my predilections are obvious)." Klein's depiction of the Clinton presidency also gave a detailed examination of the moderate Democratic positions espoused by the Democratic Leadership Council, as well as third way politics generally, of which Klein was highly complimentary.

In January 2011, during an appearance on CNN's Reliable Sources, Klein criticized the mainstream media for not handling complex issues properly, singling out MSNBC host Ed Schultz:

I was on Ed Schultz's show to discuss Afghanistan. I was just back from there. It is the most complicated issue imaginable. And the guy writes down on a piece of paper "Get Out Now" and holds it up in front of the screen. That's so stupid and it's so unworthy ... it's one of the reasons why people hold [pundits] in lower regard than they do lawyers.

== Friction with conservatives ==
=== Jewish neoconservatives and divided loyalties ===
In 2008, Klein caused controversy with comments on the motivations of Jewish neoconservatives, when he said:

The fact that a great many Jewish neoconservatives—people like Joe Lieberman and the crowd over at Commentary—plumped for this war, and now for an even more foolish assault on Iran, raised the question of divided loyalties: using U.S. military power, U.S. lives and money, to make the world safe for Israel.

American foreign policy scholar Max Boot and the Anti-Defamation League national director, Abraham Foxman, were among the critics of Klein's views.

We were deeply troubled by your outrageous assertion on Time Magazine's "Swampland" blog that Jewish neoconservatives "plumped" for the war in Iraq and are now doing the same for "an even more foolish assault on Iran" to make the world "safe for Israel."

— "Surge Protection," June 24.

In an interview published in The Atlantic magazine discussing the controversy, Klein stated

When Jennifer Rubin or Abe Foxman calls me antisemitic, they're wrong. I am anti-neoconservative. I think these people are following very perversely extremist policies and I really did believe that it was time for mainstream Jews to stand up and say, "They don't represent us, they don't represent Israel." ... I was really angry about what happened with Rob Malley. You know, it's amazing to be attacked as an antisemite by extremists who I think are very dangerous. And they seem to think, when you look at what Pete Wehner said, or what Jennifer Rubin said on their blog a couple of days ago, "I can't imagine why Time hasn't shut this guy down and fired him and blah blah blah blah blah." That's what they want to do. They want to stifle opinions that are different from theirs. I'm certainly not going to back down.

=== Other ===
In May 2009 he invited further controversy when he was quoted in a Politico.com article, wherein he stated that the reasoning and ideas of prominent conservative commentator Charles Krauthammer were of limited value because of Krauthammer's wheelchair use:

There's something tragic about him. ... His work would have a lot more nuance if he were able to see the situations he's writing about.

Klein has been criticized by several publications for accusing former CNN's Headline News and Fox News host Glenn Beck, Republican senator Tom Coburn, and former Alaska governor Sarah Palin of sedition.

== Personal life ==
Klein's first wife was Janet Eklund. The couple were married from 1967 to 1975 and have two children, Christopher and Terry. As of 2009, Klein lives in New Rochelle, New York with his second wife, swimwear designer Victoria Kaunitz, with whom he has two children, daughter Sophie and son Teddy. However, in June 2026, Klein wrote a column saying that he had sold the house in New Rochelle and was leaving New York.

== See also ==
- Afghanistanism, for his comment on the subject
