= Adam Walinsky =

American lawyer and speechwriter (1937–2023)

Adam Walinsky (1937 – November 2023) was an American lawyer who served in the United States Department of Justice and as a speechwriter for Robert F. Kennedy. He had also been the 1970 nominee for New York Attorney General by the Democratic Party. He criticized Ira Stoll's efforts to claim John F. Kennedy as a political conservative saying that Kennedy had moved to the left near the end of his life. In 2016 he endorsed Donald Trump in large part due to concerns the Democratic Party had become too supportive of war. Walinsky died in November 2023.

Party political offices
Preceded by Frank A. Sedita	Democratic nominee for Attorney General of New York; 1970	Succeeded by Robert Abrams
