= A Season on the Brink (film) =

2002 American television film

- VHS cover
- Genre: Biography; Sports drama
- Based on: A Season on the Brink by John Feinstein
- Teleplay by: David W. Rintels
- Directed by: Robert Mandel
- Starring: Brian Dennehy
- Music by: Randy Edelman; Steve Porcaro
- Country of origin: United States
- Original language: English

Production
- Executive producer: Stanley M. Brooks
- Producers: David W. Rintels; Lewin Webb
- Production location: Winnipeg
- Cinematography: Claudio Chea
- Editors: Paul Carruthers; Scott Vickrey
- Running time: 87 minutes
- Production companies: ESPN Films; Once Upon a Time Films

Original release
- Network: ESPN
- Release: March 10, 2002

A Season on the Brink is a 2002 American biographical sports drama television film directed by Robert Mandel and starring Brian Dennehy. Based on the 1986 book by John Feinstein which detailed the turbulent 1985–86 season of Indiana University's men's basketball team, led by coach Bobby Knight, the film became the first ESPN television film, premiering on March 10, 2002.

The production was filmed in Winnipeg, Manitoba, Canada. The premiere of the movie was simulcast on ESPN with the unexpurgated version and ESPN2 with all profanities censored. Future airings were of the uncensored version. The movie was also released on DVD in late 2002.

== Cast ==
- Brian Dennehy - Bob Knight
- Al Thompson - Delray Brooks
- Benz Antoine - Joby Wright
- James Lafferty - Steve Alford
- Michael James Johnson - Daryl Thomas
- Dan Becker - Dan Dakich
- Patrick Williams - Stew Robinson
- Yorick Parke - Andre Harris
- Gary Hudson - Ron Felling
- Mike Weekes - Todd Jadlow
- Duane Murray - Kohn Smith
- Thomas Hauff - Ed Williams
- Phoenix Gonzales - Charlene
- Manfred Maretzki - Joseph Wisnofsky
- Chad Bruce - Elisberg
- James D. Kirk - Pat Knight
- Digger Phelps - Himself
- Jessica Scott - Beth

== See also ==
- List of basketball films
