= The Washington Herald =

Newspaper published in Washington, D.C.

- A Paper of Quality
- December 25, 1922 edition
- Type: Daily newspaper
- Format: Broadsheet
- Owners: 1906 – Scott Cordelle Bone; 1913 – Clinton T. Brainard; 1922 – William Randolph Hearst
- Founder: Scott Cordelle Bone
- Editor: 1906 – William P. Spargeon; 1922 – Eleanor Medill "Cissy" Patterson
- Founded: October 8, 1906; 119 years ago
- Ceased publication: 1939
- Language: English
- Headquarters: 734 Fifteenth Street
- Country: United States
- Circulation: Peak circulation of 50,000
- ISSN: 1941-0662
- OCLC number: 9470809

The Washington Herald was an American daily newspaper in Washington, D.C., from October 8, 1906, to January 31, 1939.

== History ==
The paper was founded in 1906 by Scott C. Bone, who had been managing editor of The Washington Post from 1888 until that paper was taken over by John Roll McLean in 1905.

Clinton T. Brainard, president of the McClure Newspaper Syndicate, bought the paper in 1913. William Randolph Hearst, who already owned the Washington Times, took over the paper in November 1922. Though he consolidated the operations of the papers, they still published separately except for a joint Sunday edition.

Cissy Patterson was appointed editor by Hearst in 1930.

The Herald was merged with the Times on February 1, 1939, with the combined publication known as the Washington Times-Herald. In 1954, the Times-Herald was purchased by and merged with The Washington Post.

== Fictional depictions ==
The Washington Herald appears as a fictional newspaper in the 1993 film The Pelican Brief, in The X Files (3x15) 1996, the 1996 film Eraser, and in the 2013 political drama series House of Cards. It is used in John Feinstein's book series featuring child reporters, including Last Shot, Vanishing Act, and Cover Up.
