= Criticism of Akira Kurosawa =

Negative criticisms of the Japanese film director

The films of Japanese director Akira Kurosawa have had a far-reaching impact on cinema and how it is produced, both within Japan and internationally. As a result of his influence, Kurosawa's work, as well as his personal character, have been subject to a number of negative criticisms. These criticisms are points of heated debate among those who study Kurosawa's work, and scores of pieces have been written both advocating for these criticisms and defending against them.

The majority of these criticisms fall into one or more of the following categories: a) accusations, by European commentators, of insufficient "Japaneseness," particularly compared to the work of the older director, Kenji Mizoguchi; b) accusations of sentimentality or didacticism; c) criticisms of the (alleged) political stances taken by Kurosawa in his films; d) objections to his films' treatment of women; e) accusations of elitism; f) accusations of pandering directly to the tastes of Western audiences; g) criticisms of his alleged lack of contact (after 1965) with contemporary realities; and h) claims of personal arrogance and mistreatment of colleagues.

== Mizoguchi versus Kurosawa dispute ==
In the early to mid-1950s, while Kurosawa's films were being widely viewed in Europe and North America, the final films of a Japanese film master of the older generation, Kenji Mizoguchi, also began to be shown internationally and receive film festival prizes. (Note: The Life of Oharu won an International Award at the 1952 Venice Film Festival and both Ugetsu and Sansho the Bailiff won the Venice Festival Silver Lion (in 1953 and 1954, respectively).) This simultaneous exposure led to frequent critical comparisons between the two directors. A number of critics belonging to the French New Wave, such as Jean-Luc Godard, championed Mizoguchi's films at the expense of Kurosawa's work:

Since Japanese films appeared on our screens after the war, an aesthetic dispute has ranged the admirers of Kurosawa (Rashomon, The Seven Samurai, The Idiot) against those of Mizoguchi. A dispute made even more furious by the fact that both directors have been frequent prizewinners at festivals. Our thanks are due to Jean-José Richer for having cut authoritatively across the debate: "This double distinction awarded in strict equality (to The Seven Samurai and Sansho Dayu [Sansho the Bailiff], Venice [Film Festival] 1954) is unwarranted… There can be no doubt that any comparison between Mizoguchi and Kurosawa turns irrefutably to the advantage of the former. Alone among the Japanese film-makers known to us, he goes beyond the seductive but minor stage of exoticism to a deeper level where one need no longer worry about false prestige" (Cahiers du Cinéma 40).

In the same article, Godard refers to Kurosawa as "merely a more elegant Ralph Habib", referring to a very obscure contemporary French director who (apparently) specialized in adventure films.

Godard's fellow New Wave critic-filmmaker, Jacques Rivette, writes: "You can compare only what is comparable and that which aims high enough. Mizoguchi, alone, imposes a feeling of a unique world and language, is answerable only to himself... He seems to be the only Japanese director who is completely Japanese and yet is also the only one that achieves a true universality, that of an individual."

According to these French commentators, Mizoguchi seemed, of the two artists, the more authentically Japanese. But at least one film scholar has questioned the validity of this dichotomy between "Japanese" Mizoguchi and "Western" Kurosawa: "There were even suggestions by the influential [French film critic] André Bazin that Mizoguchi represented a more authentic Japaneseness, while Kurosawa was quite obviously influenced by the west, as was Mizoguchi [emphasis added]."

Kurosawa himself deeply admired the older master, particularly his indefatigable perfectionism. In his eulogy at Mizoguchi's funeral, Kurosawa said, "Mizoguchi's greatness was that he would do anything to heighten the reality of every scene. He never made compromises… Of all Japanese directors, I have the greatest respect for him... With the death of Mizoguchi, Japanese film has lost its truest creator."

== Accusations of sentimentality, naïveté and/or didacticism ==
A criticism frequently directed at Kurosawa's films is that the director's preoccupation with ethical and moral themes led him at times to create what some commentators regard as sentimental or naïve work. Speaking of the postwar "slice of life" drama One Wonderful Sunday, for example, film scholar (and future politician) Audie Bock claimed that not even Kurosawa's celebrated prowess as an editor could save one particular scene from bathos: "The last sequence… is an excruciating twelve minutes of the boy conducting an imaginary orchestra in an empty amphitheater while his girlfriend appeals directly to the camera for the viewer to join in. Angles and focal lengths change, details of leaves scattering in the wind are intercut, but nothing makes the scene go any faster."

About the Christmas scene in Scandal, when several of the characters go to a tavern and sing Auld Lang Syne (in Japanese) together, Donald Richie writes, "… soon all the whores are crying, the band is crying, the drunks are crying, all roaring out the lyrics. The horror of the situation (for this is plainly the genesis of the harrowing night-town sequence of Ikiru) does not occur to the director. Rather, these are good and simple people and this is their moment of truth."

On Dersu Uzala—a Soviet-Japanese production about an early 20th-century Nanai hunter in the Siberian wilderness—scholar Joan Mellen expresses the minority view when she writes: "Kurosawa finds an ideology… in a pantheistic belief in the magnificence of nature and in an embarrassingly archaic, Rousseauesque adulation of the 'natural man'… But the contrast between the person [Dersu] at one with his surroundings and the world of industrialization, which Kurosawa depicts only in the abstract, is largely theoretical, rendering the work a sentimental journey."

Some commentators claim that Kurosawa can at times be excessively didactic about the ethical points he makes in his films. Donald Richie, speaking of the upright hero of Red Beard (a film he otherwise praises highly), writes: "These [wise moral] precepts are known to Dr. Niide before the film opens; they are not revealed to him in the course of the action. As a result Red Beard contains a didactic quality absent from Kurosawa's finest works, films like Ikiru, which also treat social themes."

Scholar Mitsuhiro Yoshimoto, writing of Ran, claims, "as is often the case in Kurosawa films, some of the remarks by the principal characters… sound naïve, didactic or overstated (e.g., Tango's reproval of Kyoami at the film's close: 'Do not blaspheme! It is the gods who weep. They see us killing each other over and over since time began. They can't save us from ourselves.')" On the other hand, Yoshimoto also claims that Kurosawa may have created the cynical character of the master swordsman Sanjurō in Yojimbo as a reaction to this very perception of naïve moralism in the director's earlier work. As Kurosawa depicts him (this scholar claims), Sanjurō, who hires out his services to both corrupt sides in a town feud, does not kill these grotesque characters out of any sense of moral justice, as previous Kurosawa heroes might have done, but merely for the fun of it.

== Political controversies ==
During the Second World War, workers on all levels of the Japanese film industry were under immense pressure to create works that not only omitted the slightest criticism of the ruling military dictatorship, but that actively promoted kokusaku ("national policy"), that is, militarism and other aspects of fascist ideology. It was in this highly politicized atmosphere that Kurosawa began his career as a director in 1943. Therefore, some controversy exists about the extent to which his films of this period could be considered fascist propaganda. (Note: Peter B. High's The Imperial Screen (University of Wisconsin Press, 2003) is the definitive text in English on the subject of Japanese government and military censorship of the film industry before and during the Pacific War. The part of this book from chapter 8 onward deals with the era in which Kurosawa began his directorial career.)

The cultural historian Peter B. High sees Kurosawa's wartime cinema as part of the propagandistic trends of Japan at war and as an example of many of these conventions. About his second film, The Most Beautiful, which High refers to as a "dark and gloomy rendition of the standard formulas of the [home front] genre", he writes: "The film announces its [patriotic] spiritist message in the very first scene. Over a loudspeaker, the factory manager (Shimura Takashi) is giving his morning pep talk to the factory personnel: 'Only an indomitable spirit of deep responsibility can achieve outstanding production results. There can be no improvement in production without an improvement in personal character!' The montage cuts back and forth between Shimura and the workers lined up in military fashion. One of the lines is made up of extremely young boys – a depressing sight." High also points out that Kurosawa during this period demonstrated "a talent and enthusiasm for national policy scenarios" by writing the blatantly propagandistic 1942 film Winged Victory (also known as A Triumph of Wings or Victory Song of Wings) for director Satsuo Yamamoto and submitting several other scripts that won prizes in "people's cinema script" contests given by the wartime Information Bureau.

A few of the films Kurosawa directed after the war have also proved politically controversial. In her negative essay about the (mostly) Soviet-financed Dersu Uzala, Joan Mellen strongly criticizes Kurosawa's apparent acquiescence in what she perceives as "evident Soviet anti-Chinese propaganda." (The film was made during the middle 1970s, when relations between the two Communist nations were very tense, particularly regarding the Ussuri region, where the film is set.) For example, in one sequence, Dersu, his friend Arseniev and Arseniev's men find traps that have been laid in the forest for wild animals, in which the animals starve and die, to be later sold for their skins. According to Dersu, this act has been perpetrated by "bad Chinese." These "bad Chinese" also steal the wives of local indigenous men and leave the men to die; in the course of the film, Arseniev finds several such victims and rescues them from certain death.

The narrative of one of Kurosawa's last films, Rhapsody in August, centers on an elderly survivor of the atomic attack on Nagasaki who is visited by her half-Japanese, half-American nephew, Clark (Richard Gere), who appears to apologize, as an American, for the city's wartime destruction. Some viewers took Kurosawa to task for criticizing the U.S. while failing to condemn Japanese conduct during the war. Vincent Canby of The New York Times wrote: "A lot of people at Cannes were outraged that the film makes no mention of Pearl Harbor and Japan's atrocities in China… If Clark can apologize for bombing Nagasaki, why can't Granny apologize for the raid on Pearl Harbor?" At a press conference during the Cannes Film Festival, Kurosawa, Canby reported, denied that he was trying to absolve the wartime Japanese government of responsibility: "'We Japanese,' [Kurosawa] said, 'were also the victims of Japanese militarism.' The subject of the film, he insisted, is not guilt and responsibility but the horrors of war, in particular of the bomb, which has made possible the absolute end of everything."

== Objections to depictions of women ==
A number of critics have reacted negatively to the female characters in Kurosawa's movies. (Kurosawa himself once noted: "Of course, all my women [in my films] are rather strange, I agree.") Joan Mellen, in her examination of this subject, praises only the director's characterization of Yukie (Setsuko Hara), the heroine of No Regrets for Our Youth, remarking that "her face expresses the very potential of the Japanese woman that has been so often, during all these long centuries, left wasted and latent." Of the main female character in Rashomon, Masago, Mellen claims that "in none of the versions [of the film's self-contradictory narrative] is the woman (Machiko Kyo) granted self-respect, dignity or spiritual value," and argues that Masago represents one aspect of a "whore-madonna" dichotomy on the part of her creator.

Mellen also claims that, after Rashomon, Kurosawa stopped portraying women's potential in his works "as if repelled by Masago, that half-demon of his own creation." She maintains that many of Kurosawa's later heroines fall into one of two categories: the destructive and the masochistic woman. Speaking of The Idiot, she wrote, "the sensual woman is portrayed as the castrating bitch and the 'good' girl is devoid of any capacity for pleasure." In the Gorky adaptation, The Lower Depths, one heroine is "manipulative and malicious," and the other is "weak and unable to survive on her own." By the time of Red Beard (1965), "women in Kurosawa have become not only unreal and incapable of kindness, but totally bereft of autonomy, whether physical, intellectual, or emotional… Women at their best may only imitate the truths men discover."

Mitsuhiro Yoshimoto has noted that Kurosawa's films often offer a paradoxical bond between good and evil male protagonists, in which the distinction between them becomes blurred. Outside this "Möbius strip of male bonding," any woman "functions as a catalyst of sentimentalism by neutralizing" this duality. "Without being able to produce any value by herself," Yoshimoto writes, "the woman in Kurosawa's films is often the embodiment of passivity threatening the solipsism of the split male subject."

Kurosawa scholar Stephen Prince concurs with the above views, though less censoriously: "Kurosawa's is a world of men, and his interests are not piqued by the sexuality or the psychology of men and women in relation to each other… Unlike a male-oriented director like Sam Peckinpah, Kurosawa is not hostile to women, but his general lack of interest in them should be regarded as a major limitation of his work."

== Accusations of elitism ==
In Japan, critics and other filmmakers, conscious of Kurosawa's samurai background, have sometimes accused his work of elitism, because of his focus on exceptional, heroic individuals and groups of men. In one scene in Yojimbo, the samurai anti-hero Sanjurō, having reneged on his agreement to fight for one of two factions in a feuding town, retreats to a high watchtower to watch, with considerable amusement, the two sides battle it out. This scene greatly offended the filmmaker Masahiro Shinoda, who interpreted the samurai's climb into the watchtower as symbolic of the director's detached, above-it-all attitude towards the chaotic social conditions he was depicting in the film.

In her commentary on the deluxe DVD edition of Seven Samurai, Joan Mellen maintains that certain shots of the samurai characters Kambei and Kyuzo, which to her reveal Kurosawa "privileging" these samurai, "support the argument voiced by several Japanese critics that Kurosawa was an elitist":

Kurosawa was hardly a progressive director, they argued, since his peasants could not discover among their own ranks leaders who might rescue the village. Instead, justifying the inequitable class structure of their society and ours, the peasants must rely on the aristocracy, the upper class, and in particular samurai, to ensure their survival… Tadao Sato, in particular, objected to Kurosawa's view that only a handful of people are great... Worst of all, the farmers are too stupid. Kurosawa defended himself against this charge in his interview with me. 'I wanted to say that after everything the peasants were the stronger, closely clinging to the earth… It was the samurai who were weak because they were being blown by the winds of time.'

== Accusations of pandering to Western audiences ==
Because of Kurosawa's popularity with Western audiences from the early 1950s onward, he has not escaped the charge of deliberately catering to the tastes of Westerners to achieve or maintain that popularity. Joan Mellen, recording the violently negative reaction (in the 1970s) of the left-wing director Nagisa Oshima to Kurosawa and his work, states: "That Kurosawa had brought Japanese film to a Western audience meant [to Oshima] that he must be pandering to Western values and politics."

Kurosawa always strongly denied pandering to Western tastes: "He has never catered to a foreign audience" writes Audie Bock, "and has condemned those who do." However, he did concede in an interview that part of the reason he employed dynamic "Western" stylistic elements in his films was to attract the young Japanese audience of that time. Japanese youth (in the director's view) often preferred the exciting styles of American and European films and were ignorant of or indifferent to their native history and culture. "In order for them to understand I have to translate, as it were… [In Seven Samurai] under Mifune's scenes, I had [composer Fumio] Hayasaka put in a mambo. If purely Japanese music had been used I don't think the young people would have felt what that character was like, how much he resembled them… Oh, I'm Japanese all right. I'm truly Japanese."

== Alleged lack of contact with contemporary realities ==
Several critics maintain that sometime around the mid-1960s, Kurosawa appeared to lose touch with (or perhaps interest in) the contemporary sociopolitical realities of Japan. Writes Stephen Prince: "The tide of popular activism [in 1960s Japan] is relevant to Red Beard and to the films that followed because of its glaring absence from their narratives and concerns, because of the adamant refusal by these films to believe that society could be made better… By contrast [with the Japanese New Wave filmmakers], with evidence readily at hand of democratic protest in modern Japan… Kurosawa chose in his work to retreat to the past and to mythical spaces. The resurgent pessimism of the late films is defiant indeed."

Audie Bock, writing in 1978, claims that the humanist ideology that sustained the director during previous decades was no longer relevant: "By the time Red Beard was released, in 1965, the postwar era of values like 'humanism,' 'culture' and 'democracy' was over. Those who still flock to see it today do so not because it says something about contemporary Japan, but because it is a kind of summary statement of Kurosawa's values and technical virtuosity… it is the alienation of contemporary society from humanistic values that accounts for [his later films'] feeling of didactic remoteness… The shantytown atmosphere of Dodeskaden is hard to find in contemporary wealthy Japan, and the man in unspoiled nature represented by Dersu [Uzala] is hard to find anywhere in the world."

== Claims of personal arrogance and harsh treatment of colleagues ==
During his lifetime, Kurosawa was often criticized by his countrymen for perceived "arrogant" behavior. "Particularly in Japan," writes Mitsuhiro Yoshimoto, "it is not unusual to find what is supposed to be a review or criticism of his films lapsing into a critic's personal commentary, impressions, or attack on Kurosawa as a director or as a person." It was in Japan that the (initially) disparaging nickname "Kurosawa Tennō" – "The Emperor Kurosawa" – was coined. "Like tennō," Yoshimoto claimed, "Kurosawa is said to cloister himself in his own small world, which is completely cut off from the everyday reality of the majority of Japanese. The nickname tennō is used in this sense to create an image of Kurosawa as a director who abuses his power solely for the purpose of self-indulgence."

On the sets of his productions, Kurosawa acquired a reputation as a stern taskmaster and even, for some, a dictator. It is well documented that, during the shooting of Seven Samurai, he was particularly harsh to Yoshio Inaba, the actor who played Gorobei, Kambei's second-in-command, and Inaba subsequently appeared in only one other film for the director (Throne of Blood) in a minor role.

He could even sometimes be hard on seasoned, highly respected film professionals. During the filming of Yojimbo, he lost his temper with cinematographer Kazuo Miyagawa, who has been called "quite simply, Japan's preeminent cinematographer." But when one of Miyagawa's assistants asked him, "Why don't you get angry when Kurosawa yells at you?" Miyagawa answered, "Look at Kurosawa. He devotes himself completely to his work. No other director works so hard to achieve the ideal shot he has envisioned in his mind. I have no right to say anything to someone like him."
