= Cover Up =

Cover Up, or variants, often refers to:

- Cover-up, concealment of a scandal
- Cover-up tattoo, a tattoo that covers a previous tattoo, a scar, or a skin condition
- Bathrobe or outerwear wrap, worn over bathing suits, lingerie, or nightwear
- Concealer, a kind of makeup

Cover Up, or variants, may also refer to:

== Film and television ==
- Cover Up (1949 film), a mystery film by Alfred E. Green with Dennis O'Keefe, William Bendix, Barbara Britton
- Cover Up (TV series), a television spy drama on CBS from 1984 to 1985
- Cover Up (The Price Is Right), a segment game from The Price Is Right
- "The Cover-Up" (The Office), an episode of The Office
- "The Cover-Up" (Modern Family), a 2016 episode
- Cover-Up (2025 film), a documentary by Laura Poitras and Mark Obenhaus about Seymour Hersh
- Cover-Up, 1991 film starring Louis Gossett, Jr. and Dolph Lundgren

== Literature ==
- Cover Up (novel), a 2007 children's mystery novel by John Feinstein
- Cover Up, a 2005 novel by John Francome
- Cover Up: What the Government Is Still Hiding About the War on Terror a 2004 non-fiction book by Peter Lance

== Music ==
- Cover Up (Ministry album), 2008
- Cover Up (UB40 album), 2001, or the title song
- Cover Ups, a 2002 album by Good Riddance
- The Cover Up (album), a 2004 album by I Am the World Trade Center, or the title song
- The Cover Up: Original Soundtrack from the Motion Picture, a 2014 EP and 2015 cover album by the Protomen
- "Cover Up", a song by Imagine Dragons from the EP Imagine Dragons and the deluxe edition of Night Visions
- "The Cover Up", a song by Scenes from a Movie from The Pulse, 2007

== See also ==
- "Covering Up", an episode of As Time Goes By
