= Joan Mellen =

American writer (1941–2025)

- Born: Joan Spivack; September 7, 1941; Bronx, New York
- Died: June 30, 2025 (aged 83); Pennington, New Jersey
- Occupations: Professor and writer
- Spouse(s): James Mellen (m. 1966, div. 1967); Ralph Schoenman (m. 1969, div. 1982)

Academic background
- Education: Hunter College; Ph.D., City University of New York
- Thesis: Morality in the novel : a study of five English novelists, Henry Fielding, Jane Austen, George Eliot, Joseph Conrad, and D.H. Lawrence (1968)

Joan Mellen (née Spivack; September 7, 1941 – June 30, 2025) was an American writer and professor of English and creative writing.

== Early life and education ==
Mellen was born in the Bronx in 1941. Her father was a lawyer.

She completed her undergraduate degree at Hunter College in 1962. She received a doctorate in English from the City University of New York.

== Career ==
She became a professor at Temple University in 1966, where she taught for many decades. A full professor of English and creative writing by 2004, that year she received the Great Teacher Award from the university's board of trustees.

She was the author of a number of books. Her early work in the 1970s was about film. In the following two decades, she wrote many biographies, while continuing to publish work about film.

Her 1988 biography of Bobby Knight came after John Feinstein's best-selling A Season on the Brink, and presented a more positive view of the basketball coach. Sports journalists took this as an attack on Feinstein's work, sparking heated controversy.

In 1994, Mellen published the first biography of Kay Boyle.

Striking out in a different direction, in 2005, Mellen wrote a book about the Kennedy assassination, criticizing the Warren Commission investigation. Other books on mid-century political events followed. She published a memoir in 2024.

Mellen participated in a Criterion Collection commentary track for Seven Samurai with film scholars David Desser, Tony Rayns, Stephen Prince, and Donald Richie.

== Personal life ==
She married James Mellen in 1966. They divorced in 1967. In 1969, she married Ralph Schoenman. They divorced 13 years later, but remained friends until he died in 2023.

Mellen died on June 30, 2025, at home in Pennington, New Jersey, at age 83.

== Books ==
- Mellen, Joan (1974). Women and Their Sexuality in the New Film. New York City: Horizon Press. ISBN 978-0818007057.
- ——— (1975). Voices from the Japanese Cinema. New York: Liveright. ISBN 9780871401014.
- ——— (1976). The Waves at Genji's Door: Japan Through Its Cinema. New York: Pantheon Books. ISBN 9780394497990.
- ——— (1988). Bob Knight: His Own Man. New York: D.I. Fine. ISBN 9781556111006.
- ——— (1994). Kay Boyle: Author of Herself. New York: Farrar, Straus and Giroux. ISBN 978-0-374-18098-0.
- ——— (1996). Hellman and Hammett: The Legendary Passion of Lillian Hellman and Dashiell Hammett. New York, NY: HarperCollins. ISBN 9780060183394.
- Richie, Donald; ——— (1998). The Films of Akira Kurosawa (Third ed.). Berkeley, Los Angeles and London: University of California Press. ISBN 978-0-520-220379.
- ——— (2002). Seven Samurai. BFI Film Classics. British Film Institute. ISBN 978-0-85170-915-4.
- ——— (2005). A Farewell to Justice: Jim Garrison, JFK's Assassination, and the Case that Should Have Changed History. Potomac Books Inc. ISBN 978-1-57488-973-4.
- ——— (2005). Jim Garrison, His Life and Times: The Early Years. Potomac Books. ISBN 1-57488-973-7.
- ——— (2012). Our Man in Haiti: George De Mohrenschildt and the CIA in the Nightmare Republic. Trine Day. ISBN 978-1936296521.
- ——— (2016). Faustian Bargains: Lyndon Johnson and Mac Wallace in the Robber Baron Culture of Texas. New York: Bloomsbury Publishing USA. ISBN 9781620408063.
- ——— (2016). The Great Game in Cuba: CIA and the Cuban Revolution. Skyhorse. ISBN 9781510707405.
- ——— (2019). Modern Times. Bloomsbury Publishing. ISBN 9781838717193.
- ——— (2024). Sherlock Being Catfished: A Memoir. Chicago: Trine Day. ISBN 9781634244848.
