= Ralph Schoenman =

American left-wing activist (born 1935)

Ralph B. Schoenman
- Born: 16 October 1935; Burbank, California
- Died: 3 July 2023 (aged 87); Santa Barbara, California
- Citizenship: United States of America
- Occupations: leftwing activist, author, broadcaster
- Years active: 1956-2023
- Spouse: Susan M. Goodrick (m. 1963–1967) Joan Mellen (m. 1969–1982)
- Partner: Mya Shone (m. 2002–2023)

Ralph Schoenman (16 Oct 1935 - 3 July 2023) was an American left-wing activist who was a personal secretary to Bertrand Russell and became general secretary of the Bertrand Russell Peace Foundation. He was involved in a number of projects supported by Russell, including the Campaign for Nuclear Disarmament (CND), the Committee of 100 and an unofficial war crimes tribunal to try American leaders for their conduct in the Vietnam War. Shortly before his death in 1970, Russell publicly broke with Schoenman.

== Early life and education ==
Ralph Schoenman was born in Burbank, California in 1935, the elder of two children to Helen Benedek Schoenman and Theodore Schoenman, a Hungarian-American scholar, editor and translator.

Ralph attended John Burroughs High School in Burbank prior to entering Princeton University in 1953. Known as a socialist in Princeton political circles, Schoenman was scheduled to graduate in 1957, but after dropping out in his sophomore year he returned to graduate in Princeton's class of 1958.

== United Kingdom ==
Upon graduation, Schoenman left the U.S. for Britain in 1958. He was involved in various protest activities during his student days and became active in the CND after arriving in Britain. This brought him into contact with Russell, for whom Schoenman began working in 1960, the year in which the two co-founded the Committee of 100, an activist organization calling for mass civil disobedience over the British government's position on nuclear weapons.

In 1963, Schoenman met and married Susan M Goodrick in Glasgow, Scotland. That same year, he participated as Russell's secretary in attempts to mediate a solution for the Sino-Indian border conflict, after China declared a ceasefire the previous year. For visiting communist China, the U.S. embassy in London put him under a travel restriction, stamping his passport as only valid to return to the U.S.

== Kennedy assassination ==
In 1964 Schoenman helped organise Russell's Who Killed Kennedy? Committee which looked into the assassination of President John F. Kennedy. He also aided New Orleans District Attorney Jim Garrison in his investigation into the assassination. Garrison thanked him for his "encouragement" in the acknowledgments section of his book A Heritage of Stone (1970), and again in his 1988 book On the Trail of the Assassins for his "constant and crucial advice and support". In 1975 he appeared on the ABC program Good Night America to discuss the Warren Report.

== Vietnam War ==
Schoenman was an organizer and member of the Russell Tribunal, an International War Crimes Tribunal which visited North Vietnam and Cambodia in 1966-1967. In addition to the group's own camera crews, Schoenman tried to negotiate network television coverage from NBC and CBS for the tribunal's visit to Hanoi, but was turned down in a dispute over the conditions. The networks charged that they had been asked to pay for the privilege and also felt that the restrictions proposed to them, including submitting footage for censorship, would imperil their objectivity. CBS News president Richard Salant said, "They are out to prove a point with investigations and they have an ax to grind". Schoenman denied the allegations that fees or censorship had been requested, while noting that the networks would pay to acquire footage from others, as ABC had done to obtain film from one of the tribunal's cameramen.

After making these visits, Schoenman argued in a hearing of the tribunal that the U.S. had committed genocide in Vietnam. He argued, "It is not possible to drop four million pounds of bombs every day on a country the size of New York and Pennsylvania without exterminating the civilian population". Bernard Levin wrote critically of Schoenman's influence on Russell, saying that Schoenman was partly responsible for Russell's virulent anti-Americanism, in contrast to his earlier pronouncements against communism.

== Deportations & travel restrictions ==
During the course of the tribunal, the U.S. government revoked Schoenman's passport because of unauthorized visits to North Vietnam. In November 1967, he was deported back to the U.S. by Bolivian authorities when he traveled there to attend the trial of Régis Debray. As a result, he was prevented from attending the tribunal's proceedings in Copenhagen later that month because Danish authorities refused to allow him to enter without a passport. This led to a sequence in which Schoenman shuttled between several European countries, none of which would admit him, before illegally entering Britain, where he remained for 10 days until being deported in June 1968.

Russell said of Schoenman, "You know he is a rather rash young man, and I have to restrain him.". In December 1969, Russell made a public statement in that he had no contact with Schoenman and was unaware of his activities. Russell approved a vote to remove Schoenman from the board of the Bertrand Russell Peace Foundation.

== 1970s & '80s ==
In 1969, Schoenman married author and professor of English Joan Mellen. In November of that year, he founded the National Committee for a Citizens Commission of Inquiry on U.S. war crimes in Vietnam to document US war crimes in Vietnam. The Commission of Inquiry travelled around the US conducting hearings on alleged atrocities in Vietnam.

Later, Schoenman settled in Princeton, New Jersey, and was again able to travel, visiting Iran during the waning days of the Shah's government to raise awareness of the human rights violations of the U.S.-backed government. The new Provisional Revolutionary Government expelled him in March 1979.

Schoenmen and Mellen divorced in 1983, but remained friends until his death.

== Later years ==
From 2002, Schoenman worked with radio broadcaster and documentary filmmaker, Mya Shone, providing commentary for radio stations in many parts of the United States and Canada, and produced the "Taking Aim" radio show for Pacifica Radio's New York affiliate WBAI, later moving the program to an Internet webcast. Shone became Schoenman's devoted life partner for the last years of his life and organized a memorial service following his death 2023.

== Writings ==
- Death and Pillage in the Congo: A Study of Western Rule, 1965, OCLC 77008718
- A Glimpse of American Crimes in Vietnam, 1967, OCLC 468601
- Bertrand Russell: Philosopher of the Century, 1968, OCLC 5768265
- The Hidden History of Zionism, 1988, ISBN 978-0-929675-01-5
- Iraq and Kuwait: A History Suppressed, 1998, ISBN 978-0-929675-05-3
