= The Last Amateurs =

Book by John Feinstein

- Author: John Feinstein
- Genre: Non-fiction
- Publisher: Little Brown and Company
- Publication date: November 1, 2000
- ISBN: 978-0-316-27842-3

The Last Amateurs is a book by John Feinstein. First published in 2000, the book chronicles the 1999–2000 Patriot League basketball season.

The Book explored the Patriot League's model of college athletics, focusing on the lives of student-athletes at institutions that do not offer athletic scholarships. Feinstein contrasts the league's emphasis on academic priority and amateurism with the more commercialized environment of high-major Division 1 basketball programs that focus on winning and promotion to the NBA.

The seven teams in the Patriot League at the time were Army, Bucknell, Colgate, Holy Cross, Lafayette, Lehigh, and Navy. Since the book was published American University, Boston University, and Loyola University-Maryland have joined the league.

== In popular culture ==
The book made an appearance in sports culture in 2010, when future basketball statistical guru Drew Cannon cited it in a report he wrote for Scout.com on mid-major recruiting:

In John Feinstein’s The Last Amateurs, he talks about a Holy Cross player named Chris Spitler, who at one point described himself as the worst player on the worst team in the worst conference in Division I. Feinstein discussed the three stages of Chris Spitler (paraphrased): 1. There’s no way in hell you’re making this team. 2. OK, you’re on the team, but you’ll never play. 3. You’re starting. Adam Emmenecker added a stage: 4. You’re the Conference Player of the Year.
