= Robert Mandel =

American film director, producer (b. 1945)

- Born: 1945 (age 80–81); Oakland, California, United States
- Occupations: Film producer, film director
- Years active: 1980–present

Robert Mandel (born 1945) is a film and television director and producer from Oakland, California. He is best known for directing School Ties, which includes early film roles in the careers of Brendan Fraser, Matt Damon, Ben Affleck, Cole Hauser and Chris O'Donnell.

== Biography ==
Robert Mandel was born in Oakland, California, but grew up in Queens, New York, where he developed an early interest in theater. Mandel attended Bucknell University before pursuing stage directing at Manhattan Theatre Club and The Public Theater in the early 1970s.

In the late 1970s, Mandel attended M.F.A. studies at Columbia University and then at the AFI Conservatory, where he graduated in 1979. During his studies at the American Film Institute, Mandel won the Alfred Hitchcock Award for his thesis film Night at O'Rears. The film went on to win the First Prizes at Filmex in Los Angeles and the USA Film Festival in Dallas, Texas, and was also exhibited at the New York Film Festival at Lincoln Center.

Mandel went on to become a successful film director, as well as a television series director, having directed Lost, Nash Bridges and The Practice. Notably, he directed the pilot episode for The X-Files and the sixth episode of Prison Break. Mandel was initially hired to direct Carrie 2: Say You're Sorry but quickly left the production over "creative differences." Katt Shea took over as director for the film, which was eventually released as The Rage: Carrie 2.

In addition to his work in film and television, Mandel served as the dean of AFI Conservatory for nine years, from 2005 to 2014.

== Filmography ==
=== Film ===
- Nights at O'Rear's (1980)
- Independence Day (1983)
- F/X (1986)
- Touch and Go (1986)
- Big Shots (1987)
- School Ties (1992)
- The Substitute (1996)

=== Television ===
- Perfect Witness (1989)
- The Haunted (1991)
- The X-Files (1993) – pilot
- Sisters (1994) – 1 episode
- Kansas (1995)
- Special Report: Journey to Mars (1996)
- Dellaventura (1997) – 1 episode
- Nash Bridges (1997-2000) – 6 episodes
- The Practice (1998) – 1 episode
- Thin Air (2000)
- WW 3 a.k.a. Winds of Terror (2001)
- The District (2001) – 1 episode
- Hysteria – The Def Leppard Story (2001)
- A Season on the Brink (2002)
- The Secret Life of Zoey (2002)
- Lost (2005) – 1 episode
- Prison Break (2005) – 1 episode
- Dominion (2015) – 2 episodes
- Game of Silence (2016) – 1 episode
