= Bob Knight =

American basketball coach (1940–2023)

Bobby Knight
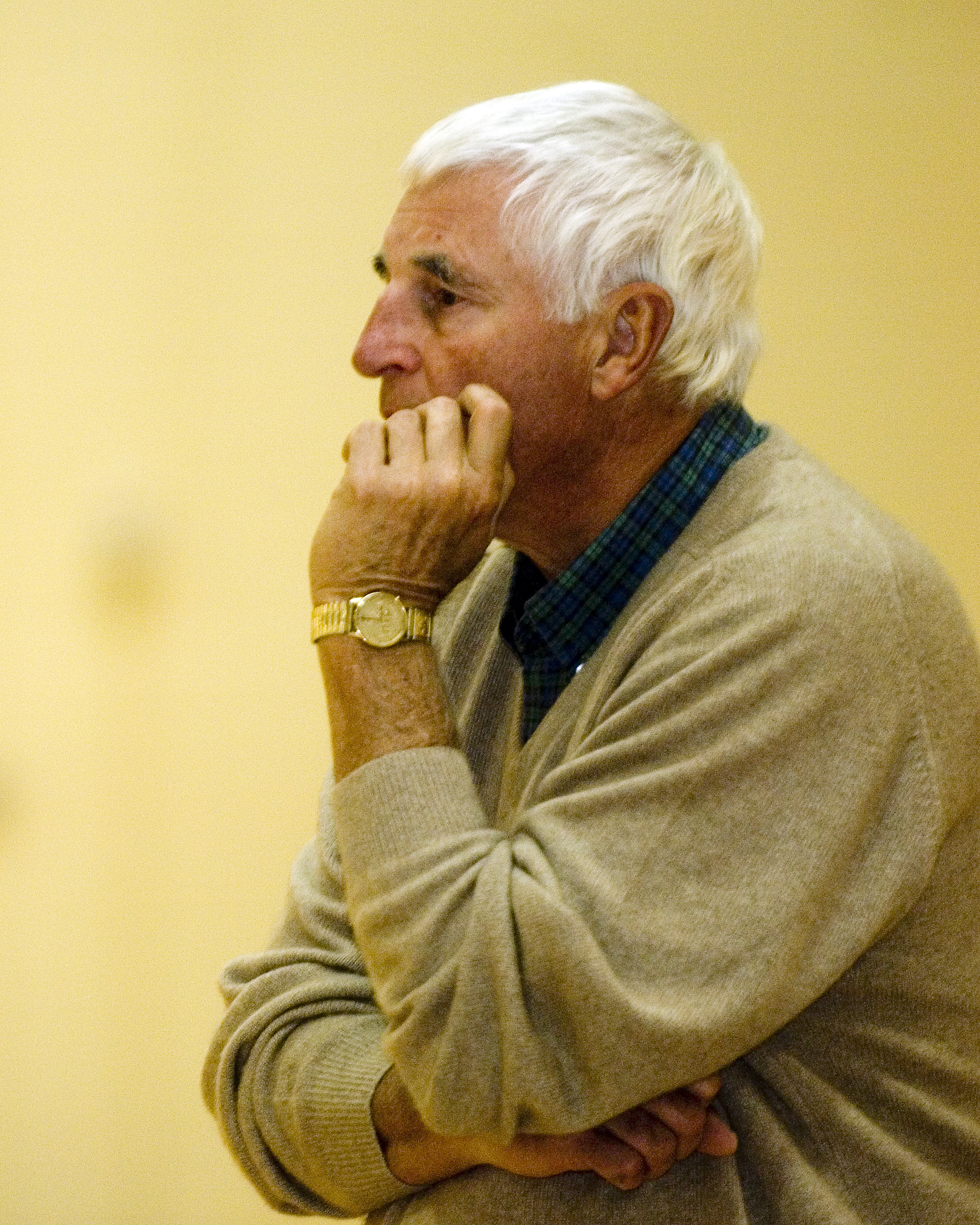
- Knight watching Texas Tech practice in 2007

Biographical details
- Born: October 25, 1940; Massillon, Ohio, U.S.
- Died: November 1, 2023 (aged 83); Bloomington, Indiana, U.S.

Playing career
- 1959–1962: Ohio State
- Position: Forward

Coaching career (HC unless noted)
- 1962–1963: Cuyahoga Falls HS (assistant)
- 1963–1965: Army (assistant)
- 1965–1971: Army
- 1971–2000: Indiana
- 2001–2008: Texas Tech

Head coaching record
- Overall: 902–371 (.709)

Accomplishments and honors

Championships
- As player: NCAA champion (1960); As head coach: 3 NCAA Division I tournament (1976, 1981, 1987); 5 NCAA Division I tournament Final Four (1973, 1976, 1981, 1987, 1992); CCAT (1974); NIT (1979); 11 Big Ten regular season (1973–1976, 1980, 1981, 1983, 1987, 1989, 1991, 1993)

Awards
- 2× Henry Iba Award (1975, 1989); Naismith College Coach of the Year (1987); 3× AP Coach of the Year (1975, 1976, 1989); Clair Bee Coach of the Year Award (2002); 5× Big Ten Coach of the Year (1975, 1976, 1980, 1981, 1989); Naismith Award for Men's Outstanding Contribution to Basketball (2007)
- Basketball Hall of Fame; Inducted in 1991
- College Basketball Hall of Fame; Inducted in 2006
Medal record
Head Coach for United States
Men's national basketball team
Pan American Games
Gold medal – first place	1979 San Juan	Men's Basketball
Olympic Games
Gold medal – first place	1984 Los Angeles	Men's Basketball

Robert Montgomery Knight (October 25, 1940 – November 1, 2023) was an American men's college basketball coach. Nicknamed "the General", he won 902 NCAA Division I men's basketball games, a record at the time of his retirement, and sixth all-time record at the time of his death.

Knight was the head coach of the Army Black Knights (1965–1971), the Indiana Hoosiers (1971–2000), and the Texas Tech Red Raiders (2001–2008). While at Army, he led the Black Knights to four post-season tournament appearances in six seasons, winning two-thirds of his games along the way.

After taking the job at Indiana, his teams won three NCAA championships, one National Invitation Tournament (NIT) championship, and 11 Big Ten Conference championships. His 1975–76 team won the 1976 NCAA tournament, and, as of 2025–26, remain the last men's team in Division I college basketball to go undefeated during an entire season (32–0).

In the seven full seasons that he coached at Texas Tech, his teams qualified for a post-season tournament five times. He retired partway through the 2007–08 season and was replaced by his son Pat Knight. He later worked as a men's college basketball studio analyst at ESPN until 2015.

Knight sparked controversy with his outspoken personality and his volatility. He once threw a chair across the court during a game and was once arrested following a physical confrontation with a police officer. He was also accused of choking an Indiana player during practice in an incident that was recorded on video, prompting the university to institute a "zero tolerance" policy for him. Following a subsequent run-in with a student, Indiana University terminated his contract in the fall of 2000.

Knight received national coach of the year honors four times and Big Ten Coach of the Year honors eight times. He was also successful on the international stage, winning gold medals at both the 1979 Pan American Games and the 1984 Summer Olympics with the U.S. men's national team. He is one of only three basketball coaches to win an NCAA title, an NIT title, and an Olympic gold medal. He was inducted into the Naismith Memorial Basketball Hall of Fame in 1991.

== Early life and college career ==
Knight was born on October 25, 1940, in the town of Massillon, Ohio, and grew up in Orrville, Ohio. His father Pat worked for the railroad and his mother Hazel was a school teacher. He began playing organized basketball at Orrville High School.

Knight continued at Ohio State in 1958 when he played for Basketball Hall of Fame coach Fred Taylor. Despite being a star player in high school, he played a reserve role as a forward on the 1960 Ohio State Buckeyes team that won the NCAA championship and featured future Hall of Fame players John Havlicek and Jerry Lucas. Knight was also a member of the 1961 and 1962 Buckeyes teams that lost in the finals to the Cincinnati Bearcats.

Due in part to the star power of those Ohio State teams, Knight usually received scant playing time, but that did not prevent him from making an impact. In the 1961 NCAA championship game, Knight came off the bench with 1:41 on the clock and Cincinnati leading Ohio State, 61–59. In the words of then–Ohio State assistant coach Frank Truitt:

Knight got the ball in the left front court and faked a drive into the middle. Then [he] crossed over like he worked on it all his life and drove right in and laid it up. That tied the game for us, and Knight ran clear across the floor like a 100-yard dash sprinter and ran right at me and said, "See there, coach, I should have been in that game a long time ago!"

To which Truitt replied, "Sit down, you hot dog. You're lucky you're even on the floor."

In addition to lettering in basketball at Ohio State, it has been claimed that Knight also lettered in football and baseball; however, the official list of Ohio State football letter earners does not include Knight. Knight graduated with a degree in history and government in 1962.

After graduating from Ohio State University in 1962, he coached junior varsity basketball at Cuyahoga Falls High School in Ohio for one year. Knight then enlisted in the U.S. Army and served on active duty from June 1963 to June 1965 and in the U.S. Army Reserves from June 1965 to May 1969. He conducted initial training at Fort Leonard Wood, Missouri and was transferred to West Point, New York, in September 1963. He became private first class.

== Coaching career ==
=== Army ===
While in the army, he accepted an assistant coaching position with the Army Black Knights in 1963, where, two years later, he was named head coach at the relatively young age of 24. In six seasons as a head coach at West Point, Knight won 102 games, with his first coming against Worcester Polytechnic Institute. He led Army to four NITs, advancing to the semifinals three times. One of his players was Mike Krzyzewski, who later served as his assistant before becoming a Hall of Fame head coach at Duke. Mike Silliman was another of Knight's players at Army, and Knight was quoted as saying that Silliman was the best player that he had coached.

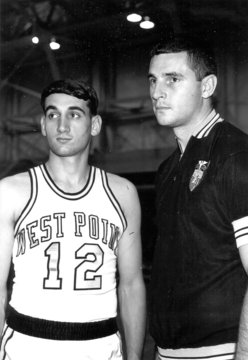
Mike Krzyzewski and Knight during his tenure at Army

During his tenure at Army, Knight gained a reputation for having an explosive temper. After Army's 66–60 loss to BYU and Hall of Fame coach Stan Watts in the semifinals of the 1966 NIT, Knight completely lost control, kicking lockers and verbally blasting the officials. Embarrassed, he later went to Watts' hotel room and apologized. Watts forgave him, and is quoted as saying, "I want you to know that you're going to be one of the bright young coaches in the country, and it's just a matter of time before you win a national championship."

Knight was one of seven candidates vying to fill the Wisconsin men's basketball head coaching vacancy after John Erickson resigned to become the Milwaukee Bucks' first-ever general manager on April 3, 1968. Knight was offered the position, but requested more time to think it over. By the time he had returned to West Point, news that he was to become the Badgers' new coach was prematurely leaked to the local media. After consulting with Bo Schembechler, who had a negative experience as a Wisconsin football coaching candidate, Knight withdrew his candidacy and continued to coach at Army for three more seasons. Erickson's assistant coach John Powless was promoted instead.

=== Indiana ===
In 1971, Indiana University in Bloomington, Indiana hired Knight as their head coach. During his 29 years at the school, the Hoosiers won 662 games, including 22 seasons of 20 or more wins, while losing 239, a .735 winning percentage. In 24 NCAA tournament appearances at Indiana, Hoosier teams under Knight won 42 of 63 games (.667), winning titles in 1976, 1981, and 1987, while losing in the semifinals in 1973 and 1992.

==== 1970s ====
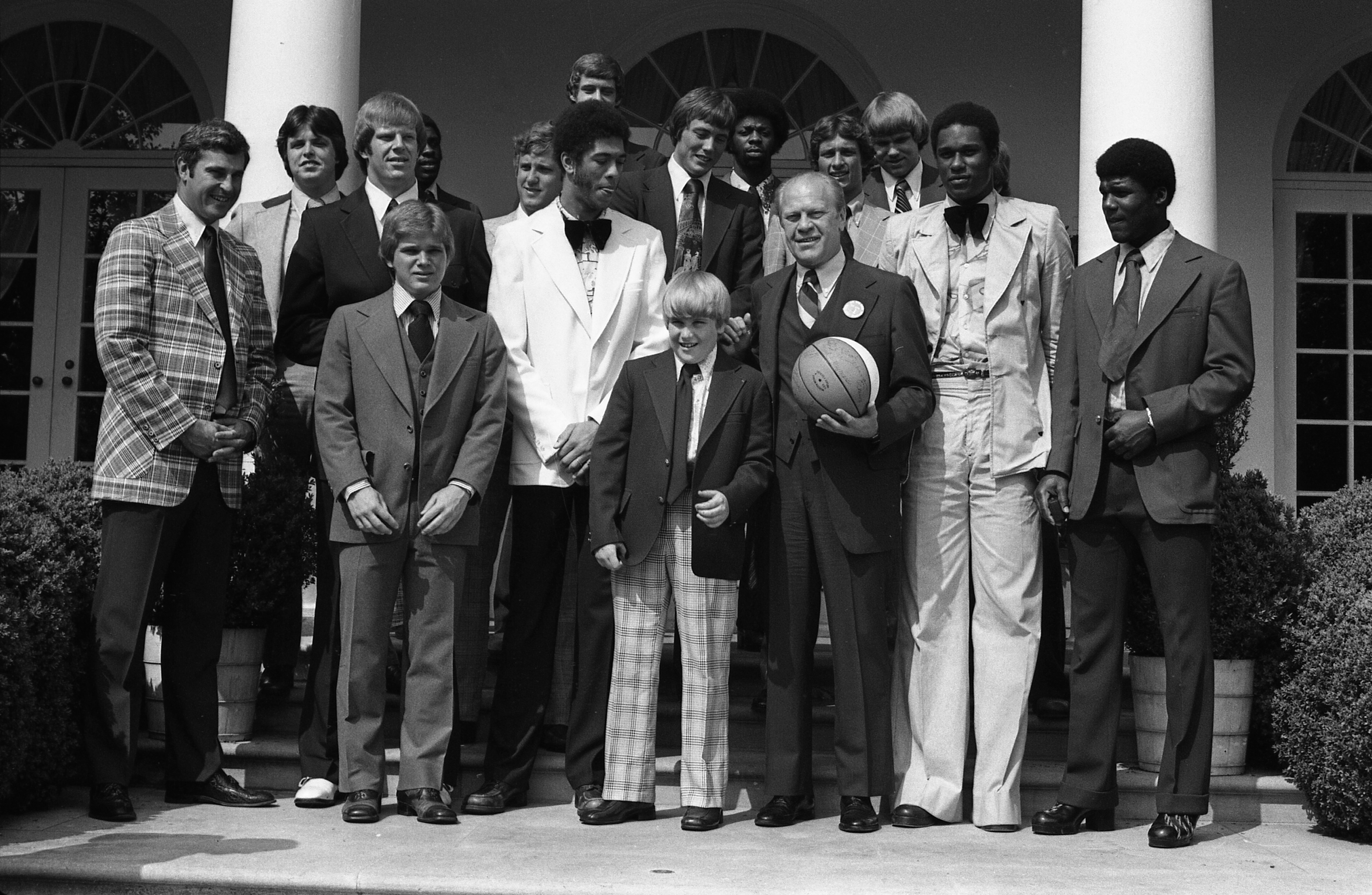
Knight (left) and the 1976 undefeated national champion Indiana Hoosiers with President Gerald Ford at the White House

In 1972–73, Knight's second year as coach, Indiana won the Big Ten championship and reached the Final Four, losing to UCLA, which was on its way to its seventh consecutive national title. The following season, in 1973–74, Indiana once again captured a Big Ten title.

In the following two seasons, 1974–75 and 1975–76, the Hoosiers were undefeated in the regular season and won 37 consecutive Big Ten games, including two more Big Ten championships. In 1974–75, the Hoosiers swept the entire Big Ten by an average of 22.8 points per game. However, in an 83–82 win against Purdue they lost consensus All-American forward Scott May to a broken left arm. With May's injury limiting him to seven minutes of play, the No. 1 Hoosiers lost to Kentucky 92–90 in the Mideast Regional. Despite the loss, the Hoosiers were so dominant that four starters—Scott May, Steve Green, Kent Benson, and Quinn Buckner—would make the five-man All-Big Ten team.

The following season, in 1975–76, the Hoosiers went the entire season and 1976 NCAA tournament without a single loss, defeating Michigan 86–68 in the title game. Immediately after the game, Knight lamented that "it should have been two." The 1976 Hoosiers remain the last undefeated NCAA Division I men's basketball team. Through these two seasons, Knight's teams were undefeated in the regular season, including a perfect 37–0 record in Big Ten games on their way to their third and fourth conference titles in a row. Behind the play of Mike Woodson, Indiana won the 1979 NIT championship.

Throughout the 1970s, however, Knight was beginning to be involved in several controversies. 1960 Olympic gold medalist Douglas Blubaugh was head wrestling coach at IU from 1973 to 1984. Early in his tenure, while he jogged in the practice facility during basketball practice, Knight yelled at him, telling him to leave, using more than one expletive. Blubaugh pinned Knight to a wall, and told him never to repeat that performance, and Knight never did.

On December 7, 1974, Indiana defeated Kentucky 98–74. During the game, Knight hit Kentucky coach Joe B. Hall. Hall said, "It publicly humiliated me," while Knight blamed Hall, saying, "If it was meant to be malicious, I'd have blasted the fucker into the seats." Years after the incident, it was reported that Knight choked and punched Indiana University's longtime sports information director, Kit Klingelhoffer, over a news release that upset the coach. In 1976, in yet another incident, Knight grabbed IU basketball player Jim Wisman and jerked him into his seat.

==== 1980s ====
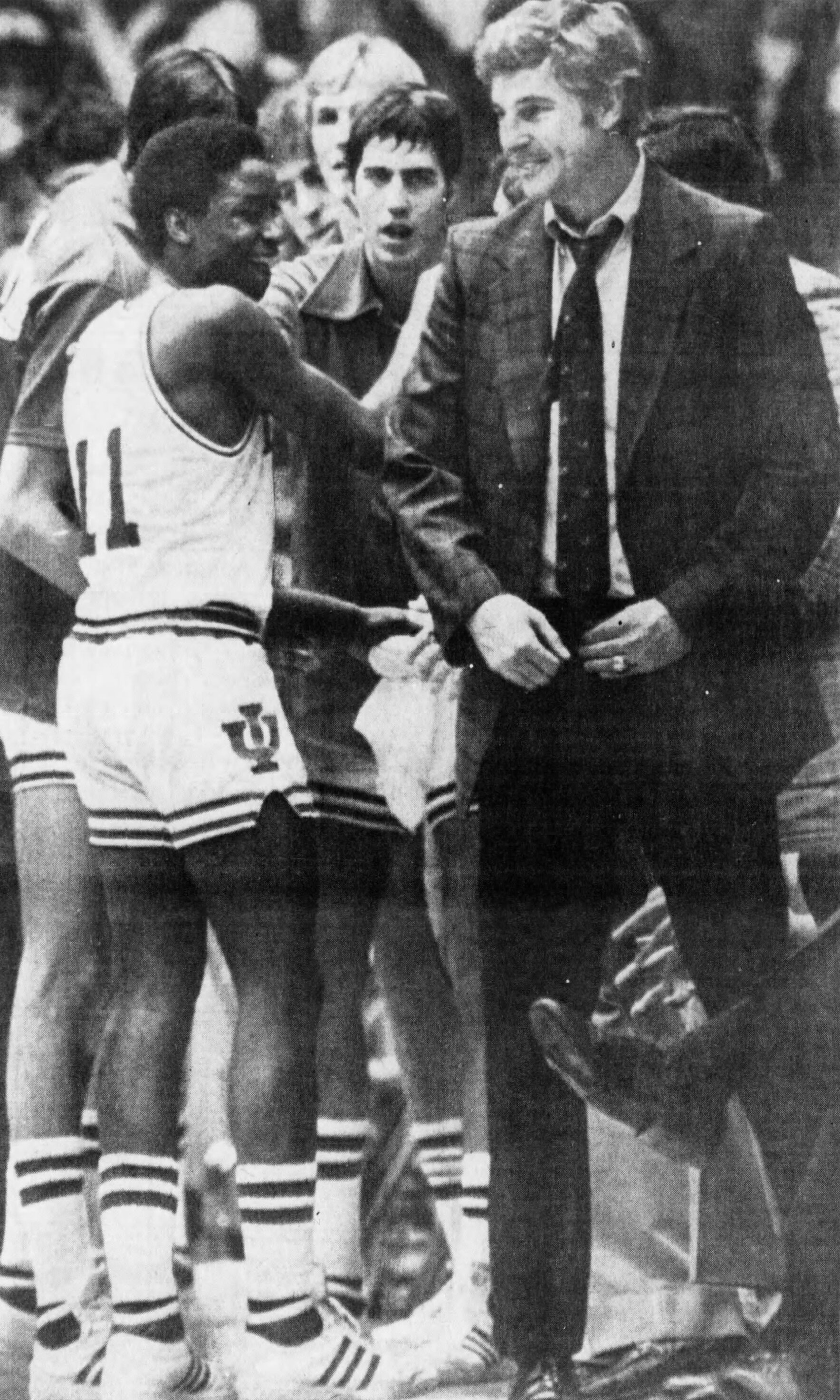
Knight with Isiah Thomas in 1981

The 1979–80 Hoosiers, led by Mike Woodson and Isiah Thomas, won the Big Ten championship and advanced to the 1980 Sweet Sixteen. The following season, 1980–81, Thomas and the Hoosiers once again won a conference title and won the 1981 NCAA tournament, Knight's second national title.

In 1982–83, with the strong play of Uwe Blab and All-Americans Ted Kitchel and Randy Wittman, the No. 1 ranked Hoosiers were favorites to win another national championship. However, with an injury to Kitchel mid-season, the Hoosiers lost to Kentucky in the 1983 Sweet Sixteen.

The Hoosiers' 1985–86 season was profiled in a bestselling book A Season on the Brink. To write it, Knight granted author John Feinstein unprecedented access to the Indiana basketball program, as well as insights into Knight's private life. The following season, in 1986–87, the Hoosiers were led by All-American Steve Alford and captured a share of the Big Ten title. The team won Knight's third national championship (the school's fifth) against Syracuse in the 1987 NCAA tournament with Keith Smart's game-winning jump shot with five seconds remaining in the championship game.

In the 1988–89 season, the Hoosiers were led by All-American Jay Edwards and won a Big Ten championship.

Knight was involved in several controversial incidents in the 1980s. In a game between Indiana and Purdue in Bloomington on January 31, 1981, Isiah Thomas allegedly hit Purdue guard Roosevelt Barnes in what some critics described as a "sucker punch". Video replay later shown by Knight showed Barnes had thrown the first punch, and that Thomas was merely reacting to this.

On February 23, 1985, during a Purdue–Indiana game in Bloomington, five minutes into the game a scramble for a loose ball resulted in a foul call on Indiana's Marty Simmons. Immediately after the resumption of play, a foul was called on Indiana's Daryl Thomas. Knight, irate, insisted the first of the two calls should have been for a jump ball and ultimately received a technical foul. Purdue's Steve Reid stepped to the free throw line to shoot the resulting free throws, but before he could, Knight grabbed a red plastic chair from Indiana's bench and threw it across the floor toward the basket in front of Reid. Knight was charged with a second and third technical foul and was ejected from the game.

Knight apologized for his actions the next day. Nevertheless, he was given a one-game suspension and two years' probation from the Big Ten. In later years, Knight would occasionally joke about the chair-throwing incident by saying that he saw an old lady standing on the opposite sideline and threw her the chair so she could sit down.

Former Indiana basketball player Todd Jadlow has written a book alleging that from 1985 to 1989, Knight punched him in the face, broke a clipboard over the top of his head, and squeezed his testicles (and the testicles of other Hoosiers), among other abuses.

In an April 1988 interview with Connie Chung, Knight also made the following controversial remark: "I think that if rape is inevitable, relax and enjoy it." In response, women's groups nationwide were outraged by Knight's comments.

==== 1990–2000 ====
From 1990–91 through 1992–93, the Hoosiers posted 87 victories, the most by any Big Ten team in a three-year span, breaking the mark of 86 set by Knight's Indiana teams of 1974–76. They captured two Big Ten crowns in 1990–91 and 1992–93, and during the 1991–92 season reached the Final Four. During the 1992–93 season, the 31–4 Hoosiers finished the season at the top of the AP Poll, but were defeated by Kansas in the Elite Eight. Players from the team in this era included Greg Graham, Pat Knight, All-Americans Damon Bailey and Alan Henderson, Brian Evans, and National Player of the Year Calbert Cheaney.

Throughout the mid and late 1990s, Knight continued to experience success with continual NCAA tournament appearances and a minimum of 19 wins each season. However, 1993 would be Knight's last conference championship and 1994 would be his last trip to the Sweet Sixteen.

Throughout the 1990s Knight was involved again in several controversies:

- In 1991, at a practice leading up to an Indiana–Purdue game in West Lafayette, Knight yelled expletives and threats that were designed to motivate his Indiana team. In one such incident, he exclaimed he was "fucking tired of losing to Purdue." The speech was secretly taped and has since gone viral, receiving over 1.84 million views on YouTube. Although it is still not known who taped the speech, many former players suspect it was team manager Lawrence Frank. Players who were present were unable to remember the specific speech because such expletive-filled outbursts by Knight were so frequent.
- In March 1992, prior to the NCAA regional finals, controversy erupted after Knight playfully mock whipped Indiana player Calbert Cheaney during practice. The bullwhip had been given to Knight as a gift from his team. Several black leaders complained at the racial connotations of the act, given that Cheaney was a black student.
- In January 1993, Knight mentioned the recruiting of Ivan Renko, a fictitious Yugoslavian player he had created. Knight created Renko in an attempt to expose disreputable basketball recruiting experts. Even though Renko was completely fictitious, several recruiting services started listing him as a prospect with in-depth descriptions of his potential and game style. Some of the more reputable recruiting gurus claimed to have never heard of Renko, whereas some other "experts" even claimed to possess or to see film of him actually playing basketball.
- Knight was recorded berating an NCAA volunteer at a March 1995 post-game press conference following a 65–60 loss to Missouri in the first round of the NCAA tournament held in Boise, Idaho. The volunteer informed the press that Knight would not be attending the press conference, when Knight was actually running a few minutes late and had planned on attending per NCAA rules.
- Neil Reed and former Indiana player Richard Mandeville, alleged in a CNN interview that Knight once showed players his own feces. According to Mandeville, Knight said, "This is how you guys are playing."
- On February 19, 2000, Clarence Doninger, Knight's boss, alleged that he had been physically threatened by Knight during a confrontation after a game.

==== Dismissal from Indiana ====
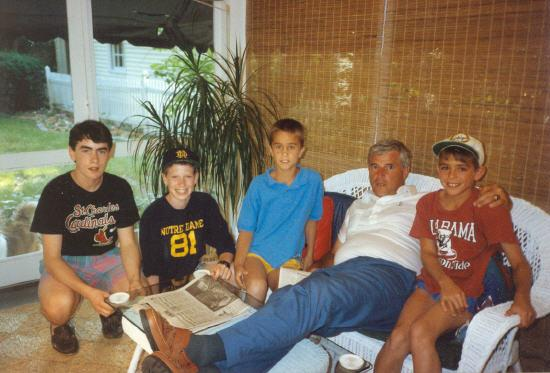
Knight with young fans at Frank Truitt's house in Columbus, summer of 1988

On March 14, 2000 (just before Indiana was to begin play in the NCAA tournament), the CNN Sports Illustrated network ran a piece on Robert Abbott's investigation of Knight in which former player Neil Reed claimed he had been choked by Knight during a practice in 1997. Knight denied the claims in the story. However, less than a month later, the network aired a tape of an Indiana practice from 1997 that appeared to show Knight placing his hand on the neck of Reed.

In response, Indiana University president Myles Brand announced that he had adopted a "zero tolerance" policy with regard to Knight's behavior. Later in the year, in September 2000, Indiana freshman Kent Harvey (not a basketball player) reportedly said, "Hey, Knight, what's up?" to Knight. According to Harvey, Knight then grabbed him by the arm and lectured him for not showing him respect, insisting that Harvey address him as either "Mr. Knight" or "Coach Knight" instead of simply "Knight." Brand stated that this incident was only one of numerous complaints that occurred after the zero-tolerance policy had been put into place. Brand asked Knight to resign on September 10, and when Knight refused, Brand relieved him of his coaching duties effective immediately. Knight's dismissal was met with outrage from students. That night, thousands of Indiana students marched from Indiana University's Assembly Hall to Brand's home, burning Brand in effigy.

Harvey was supported by some and vilified by many who claim he had intentionally set up Knight. Kent Harvey's stepfather, Mark Shaw, was a former Bloomington-area radio talk show host and Knight critic. On September 13, Knight said goodbye to a crowd of some 6,000 supporters in Dunn Meadow at Indiana University. He asked that they not hold a grudge against Harvey and that they continue to support the basketball team. Knight's firing made national headlines, including the cover of Sports Illustrated and around-the-clock coverage on ESPN, as well as mentions on CNN and CBS.

Two days after Knight's dismissal, Jeremy Schaap of ESPN interviewed him and discussed his time at Indiana. Towards the end of the interview, Knight talked about his son, Pat, who had also been dismissed by the university, wanting an opportunity to be a head coach. Schaap, thinking that Knight was finished, attempted to move on to another subject, but Knight insisted on continuing about his son. Schaap repeatedly tried to ask another question when Knight shifted the conversation to Schaap's style of interviewing, notably chastising him about interruptions. Knight then commented (referring to Schaap's father, Dick Schaap), "You've got a long way to go to be as good as your dad."

In a March 2017 interview on The Dan Patrick Show, Knight stated that he had no interest in ever returning to Indiana. When host Dan Patrick commented that most of the administration that had fired Knight seventeen years earlier were no longer there, Knight said, "I hope they're all dead."

Knight ultimately returned to Assembly Hall at halftime of Indiana's game against Purdue on February 8, 2020, and received a standing ovation. It was the first Indiana game attended by Knight since his dismissal by the school 20 years prior.

=== Texas Tech ===
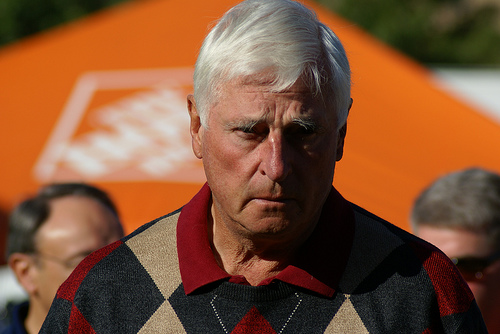
Knight in 2008

Following his dismissal from Indiana, Knight took a season off, while on the lookout for other coaching vacancies. He finally accepted the head coaching position at Texas Tech University, although his hiring was opposed by a faculty group led by Walter Schaller, associate professor of philosophy. When he was introduced at the press conference, Knight quipped, "This is without question the most comfortable red sweater I've had on in six years."

Knight quickly improved the program, which had not been to an NCAA tournament since 1996. He led the Red Raiders to postseason appearances in each of his first four years at the school (three NCAA Championship tournaments and one NIT). After a rough 2006 season, the team improved in 2007, finishing 21–13 and again making it to the NCAA tournament, where it lost to Boston College in the first round. The best performance by the Red Raiders under Knight came in 2005 when they advanced as far as the Sweet Sixteen. In both 2006 and 2007 under Knight, Texas Tech defeated two Top 10-ranked teams in consecutive weeks. During Knight's first six years at Texas Tech, the Red Raiders won 126 games.

During Knight's coaching at Texas Tech, Knight was also involved in several controversies. In March 2006, a student's heckling at Baylor University resulted in Knight having to be restrained by a police officer. The incident was not severe enough to warrant any action from the Big 12 Conference.

On November 13, 2006, Knight was shown allegedly hitting player Michael Prince under the chin to get him to make eye contact. Although Knight did not comment on the incident afterwards, Prince, his parents, and Texas Tech athletic director Gerald Myers insisted that Knight did nothing wrong and that he merely lifted Prince's chin and told him, "Hold your head up and don't worry about mistakes. Just play the game." Prince commented, "He was trying to teach me and I had my head down so he raised my chin up. He was telling me to go out there and don't be afraid to make mistakes. He said I was being too hard on myself." ESPN analyst Fran Fraschilla defended Knight by saying "That's coaching!"

On October 21, 2007, James Simpson of Lubbock, Texas, accused Knight of firing a shotgun in his direction after he yelled at Knight and another man for hunting too close to his home. Knight denied the allegations; however, an argument between the two men was recorded via camera phone and aired later on television.

Knight won his 900th game in his coaching career on January 16, 2008, in a 68–58 win against Texas A&M, but not before arguing with referees during the game.

==== Retirement ====
On February 4, 2008, Knight announced his retirement. His son Pat Knight, the head coach designate since 2005, was immediately named as his successor at Texas Tech. The younger Knight had said that after many years of coaching, his father was exhausted and ready to retire. Just after achieving his 900th win, Knight handed the job over to Pat in the mid-season in part to allow him to get acquainted with coaching the team earlier, instead of having him wait until October, the start of the next season. Knight continued to live in Lubbock after he retired.

=== United States national team ===
==== 1979 Pan American Games ====
In 1978, Knight was named the head coach of the United States men's national team for the 1979 Pan American Games in San Juan, Puerto Rico. The team, which included players such as Isiah Thomas and Ralph Sampson, trained together for more than 50 days and played in a tournament in Italy before arriving in Puerto Rico. During the games, Knight led the United States to a 9–0 record, with an average victory of 21.2 points, and gold medal.

However, his behavior during the games, where he feuded with referees, officials, and made critical comments about Puerto Rico, was heavily criticized, including by the president of the Basketball Federation of Puerto Rico, Arturo C. Gallardo, in a lengthy article in the New York Times. During the first game, the United States was leading by 35 points, he was ejected for arguing with referees and in another incident during a practice session, Knight was accused of assaulting the policeman guarding the gymnasium and was arrested. Both Knight and assistant coach Mike Krzyzewski refuted the policeman's version of the incident, with Krzyzewski stating "It's really unbelievable, the out-and-out lies that are being told. It's like my standing here and saying that my name is not Mike Krzyzewski, that it's Fred Taylor."

Knight was later charged with assault and summoned to appear before a judge, but left the island before trial was held and refused to return with Indiana officials further rejecting Puerto Rican's extradition requests. He was later tried in absentia, found guilty and sentenced to a six-month prison term and a 500 dollar fine. Following a United States Supreme Court ruling in 1987 that overturned a law which gave state governors the power to reject extradition requests and opened up the possibility of his extradition to Puerto Rico, Knight wrote a letter to the President of the Puerto Rico Olympic Committee, Germán Rieckehoff, apologizing for the incident. Rieckehoff "urged the Commonwealth not to consider any further legal action against Knight".

==== 1984 Summer Olympics ====
Despite the controversies, Knight was selected in 1982 to coach the U.S. national team at the 1984 Summer Olympic Games. He held a 72 player tryout camp in April 1984 before settling on the 12 man roster which included Michael Jordan, Patrick Ewing, Chris Mullin and Knight's Indiana player and protégé Steve Alford.

Worries that his behavior would again cause embarrassment during the games turned out to be unfounded, and despite rants at officials, Knight was considered to be on his best behavior. He led the United States to victory in all eight games and to a gold medal. Doing so, Knight joined Pete Newell and Dean Smith as the only three coaches to win an NCAA title, NIT title, and Olympic gold.

== Life after coaching ==
In 2008, ESPN hired Knight as a studio analyst and occasional color commentator. In November 2012, he called an Indiana men's basketball game for the first time, something he had previously refused to do. Then-men's basketball coach Tom Crean reached out to Knight in an attempt to get him to visit the school again. On April 2, 2015, ESPN announced that it would not renew Knight's contract.

On February 27, 2019, Don Fischer, an IU radio announcer since 1974, said during an interview, that Knight was in ill health. He continued by saying Knight's health "has declined" but did not offer any specifics.

On April 4, 2019, Knight made his first public appearance after Fischer made his comments. He appeared with longtime friend and journalist Bob Hammel and spoke about different aspects of his career. During the presentation, Knight seemed to struggle with his memory: he re-introduced his wife to the audience after doing so only 10 minutes earlier, he mistakenly said that former IU basketball player Landon Turner had died, and, after telling a story about Michael Jordan, he later told the same story, replacing Jordan with former IU basketball player Damon Bailey.

Knight and his wife resided in Lubbock, Texas, even after his retirement. On July 10, 2019, the Indiana Daily Student, IU's campus newspaper, reported that Knight and his wife had purchased a home in Bloomington for $572,500, suggesting that Knight had decided to move back to Bloomington.

== Coaching philosophy ==
Knight was an innovator of the motion offense, which he perfected and popularized. The system emphasizes post players setting screens and perimeter players passing the ball until a teammate becomes open for an uncontested jump shot or lay-up. This required players to be unselfish, disciplined, and effective in setting and using screens to get open.

On defense, Knight was known for emphasizing tenacious "man-to-man" defense where defenders contest every pass and every shot, and help teammates when needed. However, Knight also incorporated a zone defense periodically after eschewing it for the first two decades of his coaching career.

Knight's coaching also included a firm emphasis on academics. All but four of his four-year players completed their degrees, or nearly 98 percent. Nearly 80 percent of his players graduated; this figure was much higher than the national average of 42 percent for Division 1 schools.

== Legacy ==
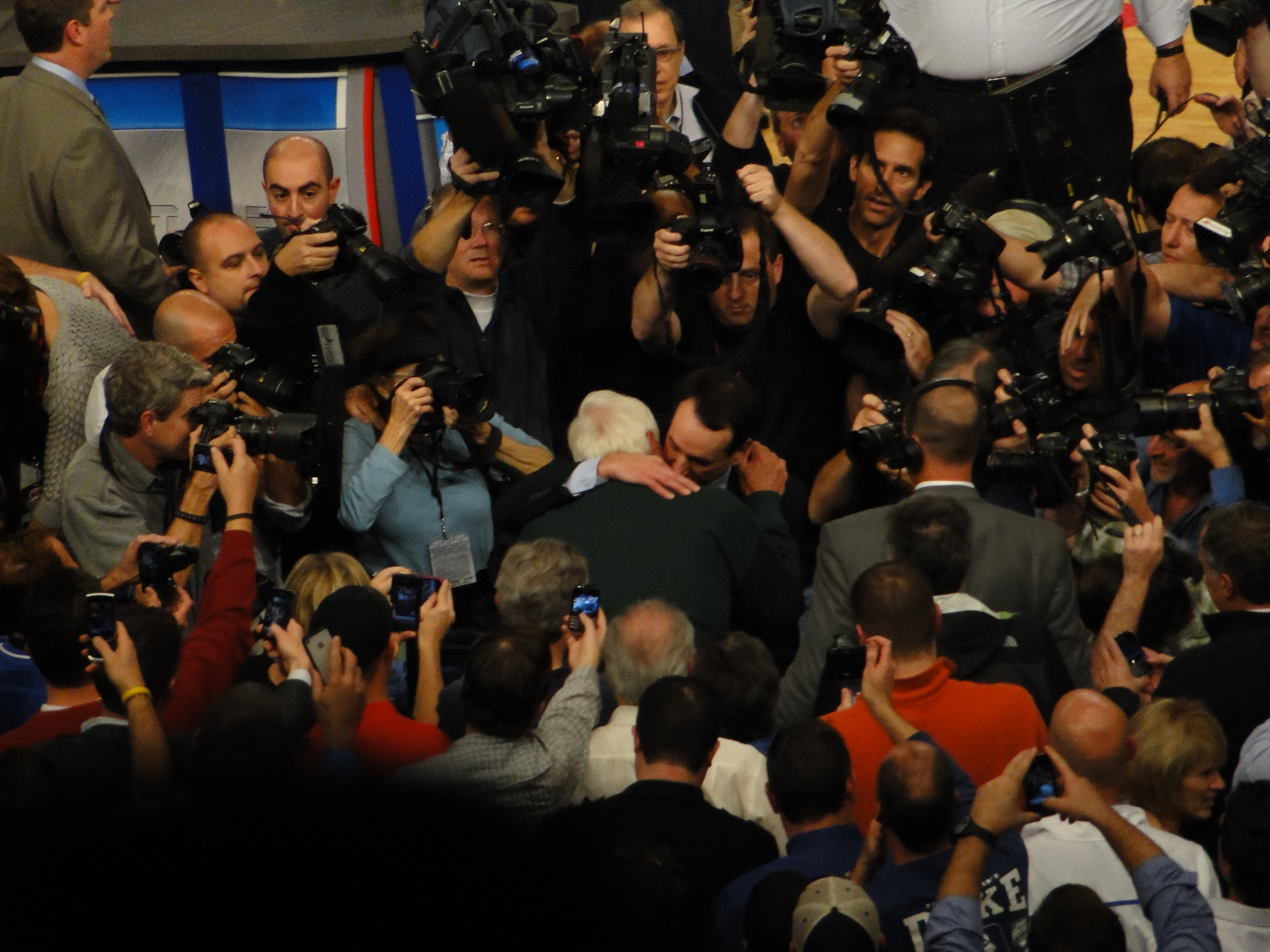
Knight embracing former player Mike Krzyzewski in 2011 after he broke Knight's record for all-time wins

=== Accomplishments ===
Knight's all time coaching record is 902–371. His 902 wins in NCAA Division I men's college basketball games is fourth all-time to Knight's former player and former Duke head coach Mike Krzyzewski, Syracuse head coach Jim Boeheim, and North Carolina head Coach Roy Williams. Knight achieved his 880th career win on January 1, 2007, and passed retired North Carolina coach Dean Smith for most career victories, a title he held until his win total was surpassed by Krzyzewski on November 15, 2011. It was surpassed by Boeheim on January 2, 2013, and by Williams on March 11, 2021. Knight is the youngest coach to reach 200, 300, and 400 wins, as well as among the youngest to reach other milestones of 500, 600, 700, and 800 wins.

Texas Tech's participation in the 2007 Tournament gave Knight more NCAA tournament appearances than any other coach. He is the only coach to win the NCAA, the NIT, an Olympic gold medal, and a Pan American Games Gold medal. Knight is also one of only three people, along with Smith and Joe B. Hall, who have both played on and coached an NCAA Tournament championship basketball team.

=== Recognition ===
Knight received a number of personal honors during and after his coaching career. He was named the National Coach of the Year four times (1975, 1976, 1987, 1989) and Big Ten Coach of the Year eight times (1973, 1975, 1976, 1980, 1981, 1989, 1992, 1993). In 1975 he was a unanimous selection as National Coach of the Year, an honor he was accorded again in 1976 by the Associated Press. In 1987 he was the first person to be honored with the Naismith Coach of the Year Award. In 1989 he garnered National Coach of the Year honors by the AP, UPI, and the United States Basketball Writers Association. Knight was inducted into the Basketball Hall of Fame in 1991.

On November 17, 2006, Knight was recognized for his impact on college basketball as a member of the founding class of the National Collegiate Basketball Hall of Fame. The following year, he was the recipient of the Naismith Award for Men's Outstanding Contribution to Basketball. Knight was also inducted into the Army Sports Hall of Fame (Class of 2008) and the Indiana Hoosiers athletics Hall of Fame (Class of 2009). In August 2003, he was honored as the first inductee in The Vince Lombardi Titletown Legends.

Three banners were hung at Simon Skjodt Assembly Hall as a result of the three national championship wins led by Knight.

=== Coaching tree ===
A number of Knight's assistant coaches, players, and managers have gone on to be coaches. In the college ranks, this includes Hall of Fame Duke coach Mike Krzyzewski, Steve Alford, Murry Bartow, Dan Dakich, Bob Donewald, Marty Simmons, Jim Crews, Chris Beard, Matt Bowen and Dusty May. Among NBA coaches, they include Randy Wittman, Mike Woodson, Keith Smart, Isiah Thomas, and Lawrence Frank.

== In the media ==
=== Books about Knight ===
In 1986, author John Feinstein published A Season on the Brink, which detailed the 1985–86 season of the Indiana Hoosiers. Granted unprecedented access to the Indiana basketball program, as well as insights into Knight's private life, the book quickly became a major bestseller and spawned a new genre, as a legion of imitators wrote works covering a single year of a sports franchise. In the book, Feinstein depicts a coach who has a violent temper, but also one who never cheats and strictly follows all of the NCAA's rules.

Two years later, author Joan Mellen penned the book Bob Knight: His Own Man (ISBN 0-380-70809-4), in part to rebut Feinstein's A Season on the Brink. Mellen deals with seemingly all the causes celebres in Knight's career and presents the view that he is more sinned against than sinning.

In 1990, Robert P. Sulek wrote Hoosier Honor: Bob Knight and Academic Success at Indiana University which discusses the academic side of the basketball program. The book details all of the players that have played for Knight and what degree they earned.

A number of close associates and friends of Knight have also written books about him. Former player and current Nevada Wolf Pack head basketball coach Steve Alford wrote Playing for Knight: My Six Seasons with Bobby Knight, published in 1990. Former player Kirk Haston wrote Days of Knight: How the General Changed My Life, published in 2016.

Knight's autobiography, written with longtime friend and sports journalist Bob Hammel, was titled Knight: My Story and published in 2003. Three years later Steve Delsohn and Mark Heisler wrote Bob Knight: An Unauthorized Biography.

In 2013, Knight and Bob Hammel published The Power of Negative Thinking: An Unconventional Approach to Achieving Positive Results. Knight discussed his approach to preparing for a game by anticipating all of the things that could go wrong and trying to prevent it or having a plan to deal with it. In the book Knight also shared one of his favorite sayings, "Victory favors the team making the fewest mistakes."

In 2017, sports reporter Terry Hutchens published Following the General: Why Three Coaches Have Been Unable to Return Indiana Basketball to Greatness which discussed Knight's coaching legacy with Indiana and how none of the coaches following him have been able to reach his level of success.

=== Film and television ===
Knight appeared or was featured in numerous films and television productions. In 1994, a feature film titled Blue Chips featured a character named Pete Bell, a volatile, but honest college basketball coach under pressure to win who decides to blatantly violate NCAA rules to field a competitive team after a sub-par season. It starred Nick Nolte as Bell and NBA star Shaquille O'Neal as Neon Bodeaux, a once-in-a-lifetime player that boosters woo to his school with gifts and other perks. The coach's temper and wardrobe were modeled after Knight's, though at no time had Knight been known to illegally recruit. Knight himself appears in the film and coaches against Nolte in the film's climactic game.

ESPN's first feature-length film was A Season on the Brink, a 2002 TV adaptation from John Feinstein's book. In the film Knight is played by Brian Dennehy. ESPN also featured Knight in a reality show titled Knight School, which followed a handful of Texas Tech students as they competed for the right to join the basketball team as a non-scholarship player.

Knight made a cameo appearance as himself in the 2003 film Anger Management. In 2008, Knight appeared in a commercial as part of Volkswagen's Das Auto series where Max, a 1964 black Beetle, interviews famous people. When Knight talked about Volkswagen winning the best resale value award in 2008, Max replied, "At least one of us is winning a title this year." This prompted Knight to throw his chair off the stage and walk out saying, "I may not be retired."

Knight also made an appearance in a TV commercial for Guitar Hero: Metallica and Risky Business with fellow coaches Mike Krzyzewski, Rick Pitino, and Roy Williams.

In 2009, Knight produced three instructional coaching DVD libraries—on motion offense, man-to-man defense, and instilling mental toughness—with Championship Productions.

== Personal life and death ==
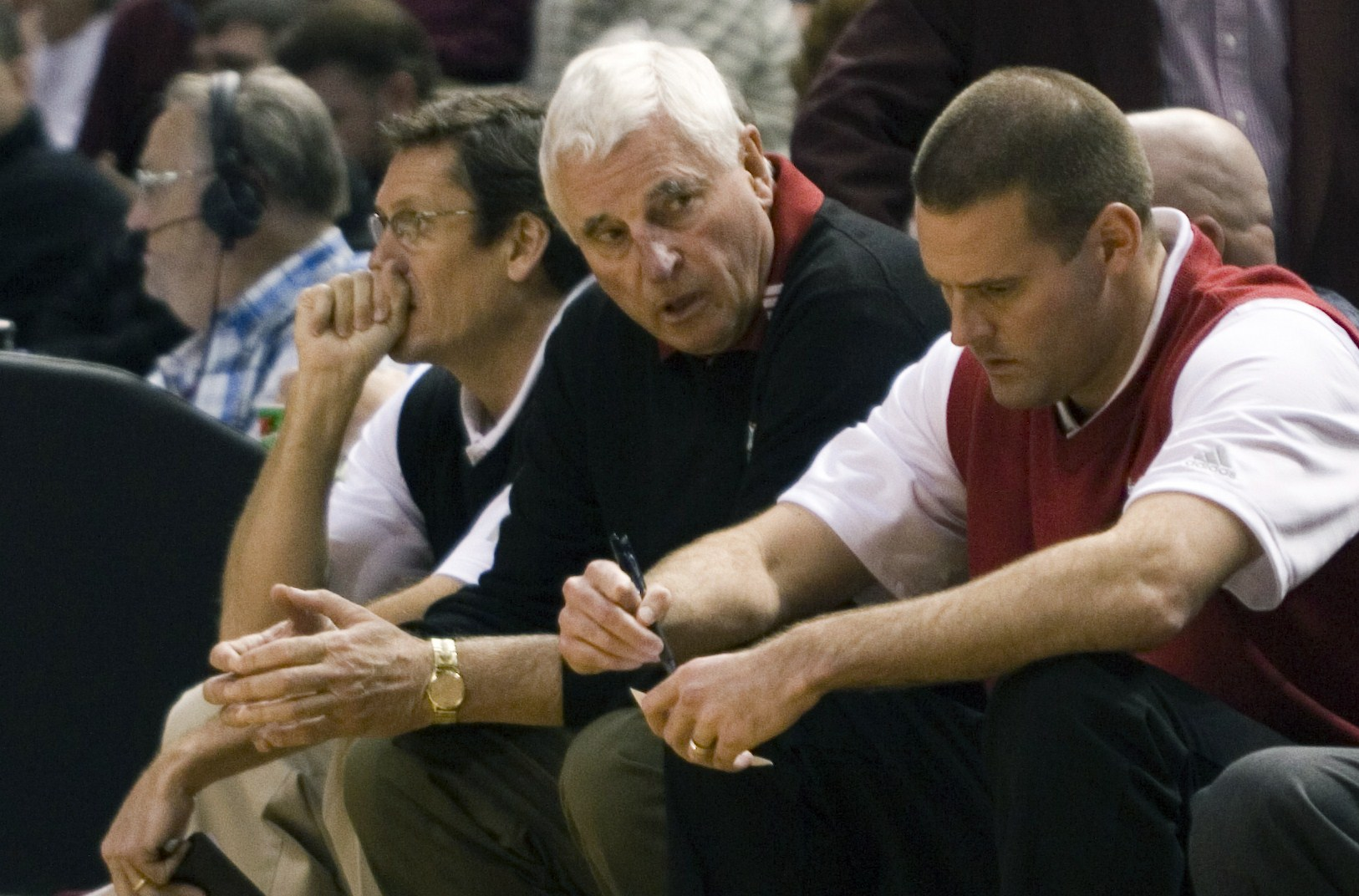
Knight with his son Pat while coaching at Texas Tech

Knight married the former Nancy Falk on April 17, 1963. They had two sons, Tim and Pat. The couple divorced in 1985. Pat played at Indiana from 1991 to 1995 and was head coach at Lamar from the time of his father's retirement until he was dismissed in 2014. Pat Knight coached Texas Tech after his father's retirement before he moved to Lamar. In 1988, Knight married his second wife, Karen Vieth Edgar, a former Oklahoma high school basketball coach.

Knight had a high regard for education and made multiple donations to the libraries of schools he coached for. At Indiana University Knight endowed two chairs, one in history and one in law. He also raised nearly $5 million for the Indiana University library system by championing a library fund to support the library's activities. The fund was ultimately named in his honor.

When Knight came to Texas Tech in 2001, he gave $10,000 to the library, while his wife gave $25,000, donations which included the first gifts to the Coach Knight Library Fund which has now collected over $300,000. Later, in 2005, Knight donated an additional $40,000 to the library. On November 29, 2007, the Texas Tech library honored this with A Legacy of Giving: The Bob Knight Exhibit.

On April 18, 2011, video surfaced showing Knight responding to a question concerning John Calipari and Kentucky's men's basketball team by stating that in the previous season, Kentucky made an Elite Eight appearance with "five players who had not attended a single class that semester." These claims were later proven to be false by the university and the players in question, including Patrick Patterson, who graduated in three years, and John Wall, who finished the semester with a 3.5 GPA. Knight later apologized for his comments stating, "My overall point is that 'one-and-dones' are not healthy for college basketball. I should not have made it personal to Kentucky and its players and I apologize."

Knight supported Donald Trump's 2016 presidential campaign, and later made an appearance at a Trump rally in Indianapolis for the 2018 midterms. At the rally, Knight called Trump "a great defender of the United States of America".

Knight died in Bloomington, Indiana, on November 1, 2023, at age 83 and his remains were cremated and buried in Orrville, Ohio.

== Career playing statistics ==
Legend
GP	Games played	GS	Games started	MPG	Minutes per game
FG%	Field goal percentage	3P%	3-point field goal percentage	FT%	Free throw percentage
RPG	Rebounds per game	APG	Assists per game	SPG	Steals per game
BPG	Blocks per game	PPG	Points per game	**Bold**	Career high

=== College ===
Year	Team	GP	FG%	FT%	RPG	PPG
1959–60	Ohio State	21	**.405**	.630	2.0	3.7
1960–61	Ohio State	**28**	.397	.577	**2.8**	**4.4**
1961–62	Ohio State	25	.393	**.818**	1.5	3.2
Career		74	.398	.641	2.1	3.8

== Head coaching record ==
Record table
Season	Team	Overall	Conference	Standing	Postseason
**Army Cadets** (NCAA University Division independent) (1965–1971)
1965–66	Army	18–8			NIT Fourth Place
1966–67	Army	13–8			
1967–68	Army	20–5			NIT First Round
1968–69	Army	18–10			NIT Fourth Place
1969–70	Army	22–6			NIT Third Place
1970–71	Army	11–13			
Army:		102–50 (.671)			
**Indiana Hoosiers** (Big Ten Conference) (1971–2000)
1971–72	Indiana	17–8	9–5	T–3rd	NIT First Round
1972–73	Indiana	22–6	11–3	1st	NCAA Division I Final Four
1973–74	Indiana	23–5	12–2	T–1st	CCAT Champion
1974–75	Indiana	31–1	18–0	1st	NCAA Division I Elite Eight
1975–76	Indiana	32–0	18–0	1st	NCAA Division I Champion
1976–77	Indiana	16–11	11–7	5th	
1977–78	Indiana	21–8	12–6	2nd	NCAA Division I Sweet 16
1978–79	Indiana	22–12	10–8	5th	NIT Champion
1979–80	Indiana	21–8	13–5	1st	NCAA Division I Sweet 16
1980–81	Indiana	26–9	14–4	1st	NCAA Division I Champion
1981–82	Indiana	19–10	12–6	T–2nd	NCAA Division I Second Round
1982–83	Indiana	24–6	13–5	1st	NCAA Division I Sweet 16
1983–84	Indiana	22–9	13–5	3rd	NCAA Division I Elite Eight
1984–85	Indiana	19–14	7–11	7th	NIT Runner-up
1985–86	Indiana	21–8	13–5	2nd	NCAA Division I First Round
1986–87	Indiana	30–4	15–3	T–1st	NCAA Division I Champion
1987–88	Indiana	19–10	11–7	5th	NCAA Division I First Round
1988–89	Indiana	27–8	15–3	1st	NCAA Division I Sweet 16
1989–90	Indiana	18–11	8–10	7th	NCAA Division I First Round
1990–91	Indiana	29–5	15–3	T–1st	NCAA Division I Sweet 16
1991–92	Indiana	27–7	14–4	2nd	NCAA Division I Final Four
1992–93	Indiana	31–4	17–1	1st	NCAA Division I Elite Eight
1993–94	Indiana	21–9	12–6	3rd	NCAA Division I Sweet 16
1994–95	Indiana	19–12	11–7	T–3rd	NCAA Division I First Round
1995–96	Indiana	19–12	12–6	T–2nd	NCAA Division I First Round
1996–97	Indiana	22–11	9–9	T–6th	NCAA Division I First Round
1997–98	Indiana	20–12	9–7	T–5th	NCAA Division I Second Round
1998–99	Indiana	23–11	9–7	T–3rd	NCAA Division I Second Round
1999–2000	Indiana	20–9	10–6	5th	NCAA Division I First Round
Indiana:		662–239 (.735)	353–151 (.700)		
**Texas Tech Red Raiders** (Big 12 Conference) (2001–2008)
2001–02	Texas Tech	23–9	10–6	T–3rd	NCAA Division I First Round
2002–03	Texas Tech	22–13	6–10	T–7th	NIT Third Place
2003–04	Texas Tech	23–11	9–7	T–5th	NCAA Division I Second Round
2004–05	Texas Tech	22–11	10–6	4th	NCAA Division I Sweet 16
2005–06	Texas Tech	15–17	6–10	T–7th	
2006–07	Texas Tech	21–13	9–7	5th	NCAA Division I First Round
2007–08	Texas Tech	12–8*	3–3*	T–6th*	
Texas Tech:		138–82 (.627)	53–49 (.520)	(*) Indicates record/standing at time of resignation from Texas Tech	
Total:		902–371 (.709) Sources:			
National champion Postseason invitational champion Conference regular season champion Conference regular season and conference tournament champion Division regular season champion Division regular season and conference tournament champion Conference tournament champion

== See also ==
- List of college men's basketball career coaching wins leaders
- List of NCAA Division I Men's Final Four appearances by coach
