= Last Shot: A Final Four Mystery =

Novel by John Feinstein

- Author: John Feinstein
- Language: English
- Series: The Sports Beat
- Genre: YA Literature; Mystery novel
- Publisher: Knopf Books for Young Readers
- Publication date: June 27, 2006
- Publication place: United States
- Media type: Print (Hardback)
- Pages: 272
- ISBN: 978-0553494600
- Followed by: Vanishing Act: Mystery at the U.S. Open

Last Shot: A Final Four Mystery is a young adult novel by John Feinstein. It tells the story of two young reporters, Stevie Thomas and Susan Carol Anderson, who stumble upon a plot to blackmail fictional Minnesota State basketball player Chip Graber into throwing the Final Four in New Orleans.

Last Shot is the first in Feinstein's Sports Beat series, followed by Vanishing Act: Mystery at the U.S. Open (2006), Cover-Up: Mystery at the Super Bowl (2007), Change-up: Mystery at the World Series (2009), The Rivalry: Mystery at the Army-Navy Game (2010), and Rush for the Gold: Mystery at the Olympics (2012).

== Plot ==
Though reluctant, Stevie's parents allow him to skip school and travel to New Orleans where he will write alongside the other winner of the contest, Susan Carol. Together, they stumble across a scandal between gamblers and star NCAA basketball player Chip Graber. They also stop Chip Graber from throwing the game away.

== Reception ==
Kirkus Reviews wrote that Last Shot "is a tale of celebrity, big business, and corruption as witnessed by two eager and innocent fledgling reporters who must decide what to do with their unexpected knowledge," and called it a "real treat for basketball fans young and old."

Publishers Weekly noted, "Though the low-key narration does not always paint a big dramatic sound, the author's passion for sports and knack for creating an exciting plot is evident." They also highlighted how "Feinstein's shout-outs to real sports journalists, coaches and players are a bonus for fans, as is an interview at the end of the program about the author's early career path and his opinion of contemporary college athletics."

In 2006, Last Shot won the Edgar Award for Best Young Adult Novel. The following year, it was nominated for the Rebecca Caudill Young Readers' Book Award.
