= Cover Up (novel) =

2007 novel by John Feinstein

Cover Up: Mystery at the Super Bowl
- Author: John Feinstein
- Language: English
- Series: The sports beat
- Genre: Mystery
- Publisher: Knopf Books for Young Readers
- Publication date: August 14, 2007
- Publication place: United States
- Media type: Print (Hardcover, paperback)
- Pages: 304
- ISBN: 978-0-375-84247-4
- Preceded by: Last Shot: A Final Four Mystery
- Followed by: Change-Up: Mystery at the World Series

Cover Up: Mystery at the Super Bowl is a mystery novel written by sportswriter John Feinstein. It is the third book in the sports beat series, along with Last Shot: A Final Four Mystery and Vanishing Act.

== Plot summary ==
Stevie Thomas is a fourteen-year-old sports fanatic who has saved a player from blackmailing at the NCAA Final Four. He has also proved that a kidnapping was actually a hoax. Since then, he and his partner Susan Carol Anderson had been signed by USTV to run a sports news show. Despite very good ratings, Stevie was replaced 3 months into the show by singer Jamie Whitsitt while Susan Carol stayed on the show. Susan Carol was furious, but decided to stay on the show for financial reasons. He flies to Indianapolis to work for the Washington Herald as a journalist for the Super Bowl. When he lands at the airport, he meets Sean McManus who hires him to work for CBS Sports during the week.

On Tuesday, he goes to the Hoosier Dome, which is a massive building. His story features the Ravens' equipment guy, Darin Kerns. Kerns used to play with the Dreams' star quarterback Eddie Brennan in high school. Stevie also gets some one-on-one time with Brennan for the story of them playing together. While he is sleeping in his hotel room, he gets a call from Susan Carol saying that she wants to talk to him right now. She says that she was at a party and a doctor who worked with the Dreams came up to her and started talking to her. He was drunk and was trying to impress her. He tells her that five offensive linemen tested positive for HGH, or human growth hormone, and that it was being covered up so the players don't get suspended. They decide that they have to try to write the story and alert the public about it.

Stevie goes back to the Hoosier Dome the next morning. CBS decides to film his story and have Darin Kerns and Eddie Brennan talk about their experience together. After the interview, Stevie talks to Eddie about the drug tests but doesn't get much information other than Eddie freaking out that he knew. After that, Bobby Kelleher, his mentor in journalism, sets him up with an interview with Steve Bisciotti, the Ravens owner. That night, there is a huge NFL party that everyone is going to attend. When he goes there he sees Bobby Kelleher arguing with Don Meeker, the Dreams owner. Later, Susan Carol pretends to admire him and gets his cell phone number.

The next morning, they get a full conversation with Eddie, who tells them about the drug tests. He also tells them that Meeker is the one covering up the test results so the players don't get suspended. Susan Carol calls Dr. Snow, the drunk doctor, and says she wants to talk. He said to go to a YMCA where they can talk. There, they try to blackmail him to get test results. He says that he will give them test results at a mall only if there are no adults around. Both Stevie and Susan Carol are suspicious of a trap. They go to the mall and Dr. Snow leads them past the empty theater where Don Meeker's bodyguards grab them and hold them hostage. As Snow is about to leave, Darin Kerns and two security men rush in and save them. It turns out that Stevie had put his cell phone on speaker and on the other line was Eddie. He heard them and called Kerns.

Eddie introduces Stevie and Susan Carol to Bob Arciero, an orthopedic surgeon for the Dreams. Arciero, unlike Dr. Snow, is honest and is not part of the cover up. He gets them the drug test documents. With the documents at hand, Stevie and Susan Carol write the story. They talk to the newspaper lawyers, who say they need comments from NFL Commissioner Roger Goodell and Don Meeker. Goodell comments on launching an investigation and punishing anyone involved. Meeker, after hearing two paragraphs of the story, goes on a profane tirade. They send the quotes and the story and go out to eat. However, they don't come back in time and are surrounded by cameras as soon as they step in the hotel. Eddie calls them the next day to tell them that he was pegged as the source and that he's not starting. Meeker is about to go on CBS and USTV to lie and try to convince people he did nothing wrong. In the process, he slanders Susan Carol on USTV.

After Meeker's interview on USTV, he had to do another one on CBS. There, Jim Nantz doesn't let Meeker get away with his story. This angers Meeker, who decides to pick on Susan Carol again after the interview. The game starts, and the backup quarterback, instead of Brennan, is playing for the Dreams. Pretty soon the Dreams fall into a hole. Eddie starts the second half and steers his team to a comeback. While the game is going on, Tal Vincent lets it slip that Mike Shupe was the one who was feeding Meeker information. Jamie Whitsitt, who is a singer and was Stevie's replacement on USTV, leads them into the studio and gives them a tape. He had left it on record while Don Meeker and Mike Shupe were having their conversation. It has Meeker clearly saying that he bribed the doctors to keep quiet. After this, Eddie and the Dreams win the Super Bowl on a miracle play. Stevie proves that Don Meeker was covering up and that the owners could vote to force Meeker to sell the team.

== Characters ==
- Steven Richman Thomas, a fourteen-year-old sports fanatic living in Philadelphia, was hired by a sports network USTV. Fired by USTV three months later because he's not good-looking enough. He goes to the Super Bowl to work for the story's fictional newspaper, the Washington Herald. At the airport in Indianapolis, he gets hired by CBS to work for them during Super Bowl week. In the middle of the week, he finds out that the Dreams' offensive line tested positive for steroids and that the Dreams' owner is covering up the test results. Once he gets all the evidence, he breaks the story.
- Susan Carol Anderson, a tall, pretty girl from Goldsboro, North Carolina, is Stevie's partner on USTV. When Stevie gets fired, she threatens to quit but stays for the financial benefit. When they break the story together they decide to start officially dating.
- Eddie Brennan, the quarterback of the Dreams, is one of the team's players who is on Stevie and Susan Carol's side. He decides to tell Stevie and Susan Carol everything he knew about the cover up. He hooks them up to a doctor who gives them test results. Deep down, he knows he did the right thing, but he knew that he would be nothing but a snitch to his teammates. Before the game, Meeker pegs Eddie as the source of the story and gets him benched. During the first half of the Super Bowl, he watches his team fall apart under the backup quarterback. In the second half, the Dreams come back in the second half to win the Super Bowl under Eddie.
- Bobby Kelleher, a columnist for the Washington Herald, is Stevie's journalism mentor. He helps Stevie out with his stories and supervises him in Indianapolis.He also gives ideas to him
- Tamara Mearns, Susan Carol's journalism mentor, writes for The Washington Post and is Bobby Kelleher's wife.
- Jamie Whitsitt, a sandy-blond haired, blue eyed six-footer, is a singer from California who replaces Stevie on USTV. He seems dumb to Stevie and uses dude in every sentence.
- Darin Kerns, the equipment guy for the Ravens, used to play with Eddie Brennan in high school and was interviewed by Stevie for a story. He also saves Stevie and Susan Carol after they are held hostage by Dr. Snow.
- Sean McManus, the president of CBS Sports, hires Stevie to work for CBS during Super Bowl week.
- Dewey Blanton, a PR person for the Dreams, helps Stevie get time to talk to Dreams players.
- Tal Vincent, Stevie's ex-producer, picks on Stevie often during Super Bowl week. During the game, he lets it slip that Mike Shupe was the person from USTV feeding Don Meeker information.
- Mike Shupe, the executive producer of USTV, is the one who fires Stevie and works for Don Meeker. He was feeding Meeker information about what Stevie and Susan Carol were doing.
- Tom Snow, a doctor for the Dreams, got drunk during a party and told Susan Carol that the five offensive linemen for the Dreams tested positive for HGH. Later, Stevie and Susan Carol try to blackmail him and he says that he will give them documents at a mall. At the mall, he lures them into a trap and Don Meeker's bodyguards trap them. They are rescued by Darin Kerns and two security men who work for the Ravens.
- Steve Bisciotti, the owner of the Ravens team, is a person who is as rich as Don Meeker but doesn't have his attitude. Stevie interviews him for a story.
- Donald Meeker, the owner of the Dreams, is a very rich, but very mean man. He paid a billion dollars as the expansion fee for the Dreams to join the NFL. When the drug tests of the offensive linemen came back positive, he covered it up so the NFL wouldn't find out. He talked to Shupe privately about the cover up plot, but it was secretly taped and Meeker was exposed. He often uses profanity and slandered Susan Carol on USTV. In the end, because of his cover up plot, the owners would vote to force him to sell the team.
- Roger Goodell, the commissioner of the NFL, gives a comment for the HGH story.
- Andy Kaplan, one of the producers for CBS, is the person Stevie works with for CBS.
- Bob Arciero, an orthopedic surgeon for the Dreams, gets Stevie and Susan Carol the documents of the drug tests so they can write the story.

== Reception ==
For style, Horn Book Magazine said, "The fast paced action propels the plot." It also said "Feinstein's ease with the sports milieu creates a glamorous background."

In general, Cover Up received mixed reviews. Horn Book Magazine wrote that Cover Up is an "Undemading, but satisfying read. It's a great mix of fact and fiction that blends together to make an interesting plot and great page-turner." Booklist called it "good fun for younger teen sports fans willing to go with the formula" and added that "This series delivers an entertaining mix of mystery, insider detail, and ripped-from-the-headlines subject matter."

== Bibliography ==
Feinstein, John. Cover Up. New York: Yearling, 2007.
