= A Season on the Brink =

Book by John Feinstein

- Paperback edition cover
- Author: John Feinstein
- Language: English
- Genre: Sports
- Publisher: Macmillan Publishing Company
- Publication date: 1986
- Publication place: United States
- Pages: 311
- ISBN: 0025372300

A Season on the Brink is a 1986 book by John Feinstein which detailed the 1985–86 season of Indiana University's men's basketball team, led by the controversial coach Bob Knight. Granted almost unprecedented access to the Indiana University basketball program, as well as insights into Knight's private life, the book spawned a new genre, as a legion of imitators wrote works covering a single year of a sports franchise.

== Writing the book ==
Feinstein spent six months with the 1985–86 team. He had previously covered Bob Knight in his role as the National College Basketball Writer for The Washington Post. Remarking on his relationship with Bob Knight, Feinstein said the following:

Bob is – I have often said Bob is the most black and white person I have ever met. The only gray in his life is in his hair. He either really likes you or really doesn't like you. I have experienced both. And Knight liked me. Some other writers who he respected had spoken up on my behalf. Some coaches who he liked had spoken up on my behalf before I had ever really written a word about him. But then I covered his Olympic team in 1984. So I was around him quite a bit throughout that summer when the U.S. won the Gold Medal in Los Angeles...

== Reception and impact ==
A Season on the Brink was extremely well received when first published, and is often referred to as "the bestselling sports book of all time". Although it has sold more than two million copies worldwide, it is not in fact the bestselling of all time. The initial book tour for Season on the Brink was two days in the state of Indiana, but because of its popularity the promotional tour ended up being much larger.

As a result of the book, the NCAA passed a rule banning members of the media from being in the locker room of a team before or during a game. Moreover, if one member of the media was allowed, then the locker room was then opened to all members of the media.

== Film version ==
A film version of A Season on the Brink was made in 2002, becoming the first ESPN television movie. The movie was filmed in Winnipeg, Manitoba, Canada, and is notable for its prevalent use of profanity, intended to accurately represent Knight's tirades.
