= John Feinstein =

American sportswriter and commentator (1956–2025)

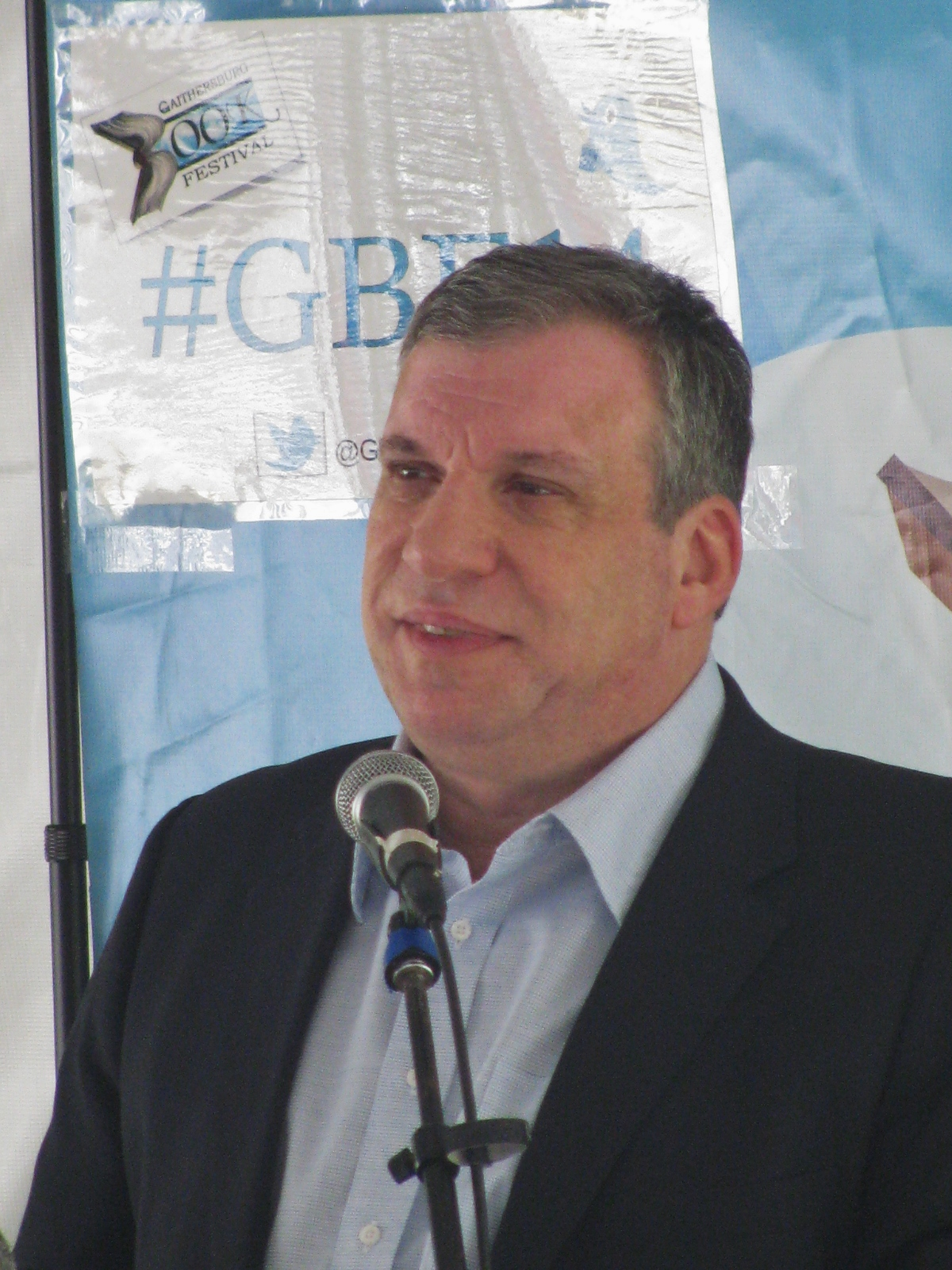
- Feinstein in 2014
- Born: July 28, 1955; New York City, U.S.
- Died: March 13, 2025 (aged 69); McLean, Virginia, U.S.
- Education: Duke University
- Occupations: Sportswriter; author; sports commentator; columnist
- Spouses: Mary Clare Gibbons (divorced); Christine Bauch (m. 2010)
- Children: 3

John Feinstein (/ˈfaɪnstiːn/ FYNE-steen; July 28, 1955 – March 13, 2025) was an American sportswriter, author, and sports commentator. A long-time sports reporter at the Washington Post, he also wrote numerous books and was particularly known for A Season on the Brink, published in 1986, which chronicled a season with Bob Knight's Indiana Hoosiers men's basketball team.

== Early life and education ==
Feinstein was born to a Jewish family in New York City on July 28, 1955. His father was the General Manager of the Washington National Opera from 1980 to 1995 as well as the first executive director of the Kennedy Center in Washington, D.C. He attended Columbia Grammar & Preparatory School and Duke University, where he was a sports reporter for the Duke Chronicle and graduated in 1977.

== Career ==
Feinstein joined the Washington Post in 1977 and was a full-time reporter there until 1991. He was also a columnist for Sporting News and Golf Digest. His last column, about Michigan State men's basketball coach Tom Izzo, was published in the Washington Post on the day of his death, March 13, 2025; he had completed it the day before. He received the Curt Gowdy Award for print media of the Basketball Hall of Fame in 2013, and was a voter in the AP Top 25 poll for men's college basketball for more than 20 years.

In broadcasting, he was a commentator on ESPN, where he appeared regularly on The Sports Reporters, on the Golf Channel, at United States Naval Academy football games, and on radio shows and podcasts including The Sports Junkies, The Tony Kornheiser Show, and The Jim Rome Show. On March 8, 2012, he joined SiriusXM's Mad Dog Sports Radio channel, teaming up with Bruce Murray for the sports talk show Beyond the Brink. He left by fall 2012 to host his own show on the new CBS Sports Radio, which began 24/7 all sports talk on January 2, 2013. In November 2014, he told an interviewer that CBS had fired him from the show.

Feinstein returned to Duke University in the early 1990s as a visiting professor of sports journalism, and at the time of his death was a writer in residence at Longwood University.

Feinstein wrote more than 40 books, of which the best known is A Season on the Brink (1986), chronicles the 1985–86 season of the Indiana University basketball team under coach Bobby Knight; Feinstein took a leave of absence from the Washington Post to embed himself with the team. An ESPN film adaptation, starring Brian Dennehy as Knight, first aired on March 10, 2002, with a version censored for profanity being simulcast on ESPN2. It was released to DVD later in 2002. After publishing Caddy for Life: The Bruce Edwards Story (2004), about the life and final days of Tom Watson's caddy, Bruce Edwards, who was diagnosed with ALS, Feinstein and long-time friend Terry Hanson engaged the William Morris Agency and commissioned a screenplay in conjunction with Matt Damon's and Ben Affleck's production company, LivePlanet. The documentary Caddy for Life was produced in 2010 for the Golf Channel. He also wrote sports novels for young adults.

== Personal life and death ==
Feinstein was first married to Mary Clare Gibbons; following their divorce, he married Christine Bauch in 2010. He had two children from his first marriage and one from his second.

Feinstein died from an apparent heart attack at his brother's home in McLean, Virginia, on March 13, 2025, at the age of 69.

== Works ==
=== Nonfiction ===
- The First Coming: Tiger Woods, Master or Martyr (1998) ISBN 0-345-42286-4
- A Season on the Brink (1986) ISBN 0-671-68877-4
- A Season Inside (1988) ISBN 0-394-56891-5 A followup to A Season on the Brink, on the 1987–88 college basketball season. One of the teams Feinstein most closely followed was eventual national champion Kansas.
- Forever's Team (1990) ISBN 0-394-56892-3 The Duke team that lost in the NCAA final game in 1978. Because many of its stars were freshmen and sophomores, they were widely expected to win a national title, but never did so.
- Hard Courts (1992) ISBN 0-679-74106-2 One year (1990) on the men's and women's professional tennis tours.
- Play Ball (1993) ISBN 0-679-41618-8 The 1992 Major League Baseball season.
- A Good Walk Spoiled: Days And Nights on the PGA Tour (1995) ISBN 0-316-27737-1 Winner of the William Hill Sports Book of the Year in 1995.
- A Civil War: Army vs. Navy (1996) ISBN 0-316-27824-6 The 1995 football season at two US military academies, culminating in the Army–Navy Game.
- A March to Madness (1998) ISBN 0-316-27712-6 The 1996–97 basketball season in nine schools of the Atlantic Coast Conference. This was the last season for North Carolina coach Dean Smith.
- The Last Amateurs (2000) ISBN 0-316-27842-4 The 1999–2000 basketball season in the Patriot League, a low-ranked NCAA Division I basketball conference that at the time did not permit athletic scholarships.
- The Majors: In Pursuit of Golf's Holy Grail (2000) ISBN 0-316-27795-9
- The Punch: One Night, Two Lives, and the Fight that Changed Basketball Forever (2002) ISBN 0-316-73563-9 The punch thrown by Kermit Washington that nearly killed Rudy Tomjanovich during an NBA game in 1977, and its impact on both men and the league.
- Open: Inside the Ropes at Bethpage Black (2003) ISBN 0-316-77852-4 The 2002 U.S. Open golf tournament, held at the Black Course at Bethpage State Park on Long Island.
- Let Me Tell You a Story (with Red Auerbach, 2004) ISBN 0-316-73823-9 Feinstein's interviews with the coach of the Boston Celtics.
- Caddy For Life: The Bruce Edwards Story (2004) ISBN 0-316-77788-9
- Next Man Up: A Year Behind the Lines in Today's NFL (2005) ISBN 0-316-00964-4 The 2004–05 Baltimore Ravens
- Last Dance: Behind the Scenes at the Final Four (2006) ISBN 0-316-16030-X Players, coaches, and referees in the NCAA men's basketball tournament Final Four.
- Tales from Q School: Inside Golf's Fifth Major (2007) ISBN 0-316-01430-3 The players who competed at the 2005 PGA Tour Q School, ranging from obscure golfers who never reached the PGA Tour to Brett Wetterich, who went on to win the Byron Nelson Championship and play in the 2006 Ryder Cup.
- Living on the Black: Two Pitchers, Two Teams, One Season to Remember (2008) ISBN 0-316-11391-3 Following Mike Mussina of the New York Yankees and Tom Glavine of the New York Mets over one baseball season.
- Moment of Glory: The Year Underdogs Ruled Golf (2010) ISBN 0-316-02531-3 The four relatively obscure golfers who won the men's majors in 2003.
- One on One: Behind the Scenes With the Greats in the Game (2011) ISBN 9780316079044.
- Where Nobody Knows Your Name: Life In the Minor Leagues of Baseball (2014) ISBN 0-385-53593-7 Players and managers from the International League, a Triple-A league, in 2012. Among them are Scott Podsednik, a former major league All-Star and World Series hero looking for one last chance in the big leagues, and John Lindsey, who made his major league debut in 2010 after sixteen years of minor and independent league baseball, seeking another crack at the majors.
- The Legends Club: Dean Smith, Mike Krzyzewski, Jim Valvano and an Epic College Basketball Rivalry (2016) ISBN 9780385539418 Three North Carolina coaching legends, their stories and mutual rivalries.
- Raise a Fist, Take a Knee (2021) ISBN 978-0-316-54092-6 Race and the Illusion of Progress in Modern Sports.
- The Ancient Eight: College Football's Ivy League and the Game they Play Today (2024) ISBN 9780306833908

=== Adult fiction ===
- Running Mates (1992) ISBN 0-679-41220-4 A political novel.

=== Fiction for young readers ===
==== Stand-alone ====
- Foul Trouble (2013) ISBN 978-0375869648
- Backfield Boys: A Football Mystery in Black and White (2017) ISBN 9780374305925
- The Prodigy (2018) ISBN 9780374305956

==== The Benchwarmers Series ====
1. Benchwarmers (2019) ISBN 9780374312039
2. Game Changers (2020) ISBN 9780374312053
3. Mixed Doubles (2022) ISBN 9780374312077

==== The Sports Beat ====
A sports-mystery series for young adults in which main characters Stevie Thomas and Susan Carol Anderson are reporting on major sporting events.

1. Last Shot: Mystery at the Final Four (2006) ISBN 978-0553494600. Winner of the 2006 Edgar Award in the Best Young Adult category.
2. Vanishing Act: Mystery at the US Open (2006) ISBN 9780375835926
3. Cover Up: Mystery at the Super Bowl (2007) ISBN 0-375-84247-0
4. Change-Up: Mystery at the World Series (2009) ISBN 0-375-85636-6
5. The Rivalry: Mystery at the Army-Navy Game (2010) ISBN 0-375-86570-5
6. Rush for the Gold: Mystery at the Olympics (2012) ISBN 9780375869631
