= List of U.S. men's college basketball national player of the year awards =

This article lists U.S. men's college basketball national player of the year awards. Several organizations sponsor an award for the top men's college basketball player in the United States. Thirty (30) times since there have been six player of the year awards has a single player won all awards. These players are considered the consensus national player of the year.

== Sponsoring organizations ==
Active awards
Award name	Sponsoring organization	First awarded
The Sporting News Player of the Year	The Sporting News	1943
Oscar Robertson Trophy	U.S. Basketball Writers Association	1959
Associated Press Player of the Year	Associated Press	1961
Naismith College Player of the Year	Atlanta Tipoff Club	1969
NABC Player of the Year	National Association of Basketball Coaches	1975
John R. Wooden Award	Los Angeles Athletic Club	1977

Discontinued awards
Award name	Sponsoring organization	Years awarded
Helms Foundation Player of the Year	Helms Athletic Foundation	1905–1983
UPI Player of the Year	United Press International	1955–1996
Adolph Rupp Trophy	Commonwealth Athletic Club of Kentucky	1972–2015
Basketball Times Player of the Year	Basketball Times	1982–2021

== Key ==
†	Shared (non-consensus) national players of the year
Player (X)	Denotes the number of years the player has been awarded a national player of the year award at that point
✓	Player won award
✗	Player did not win award
T	Tied for award

== List of awardees ==
The below list includes winners from just the active national player of the year award sponsoring organizations.

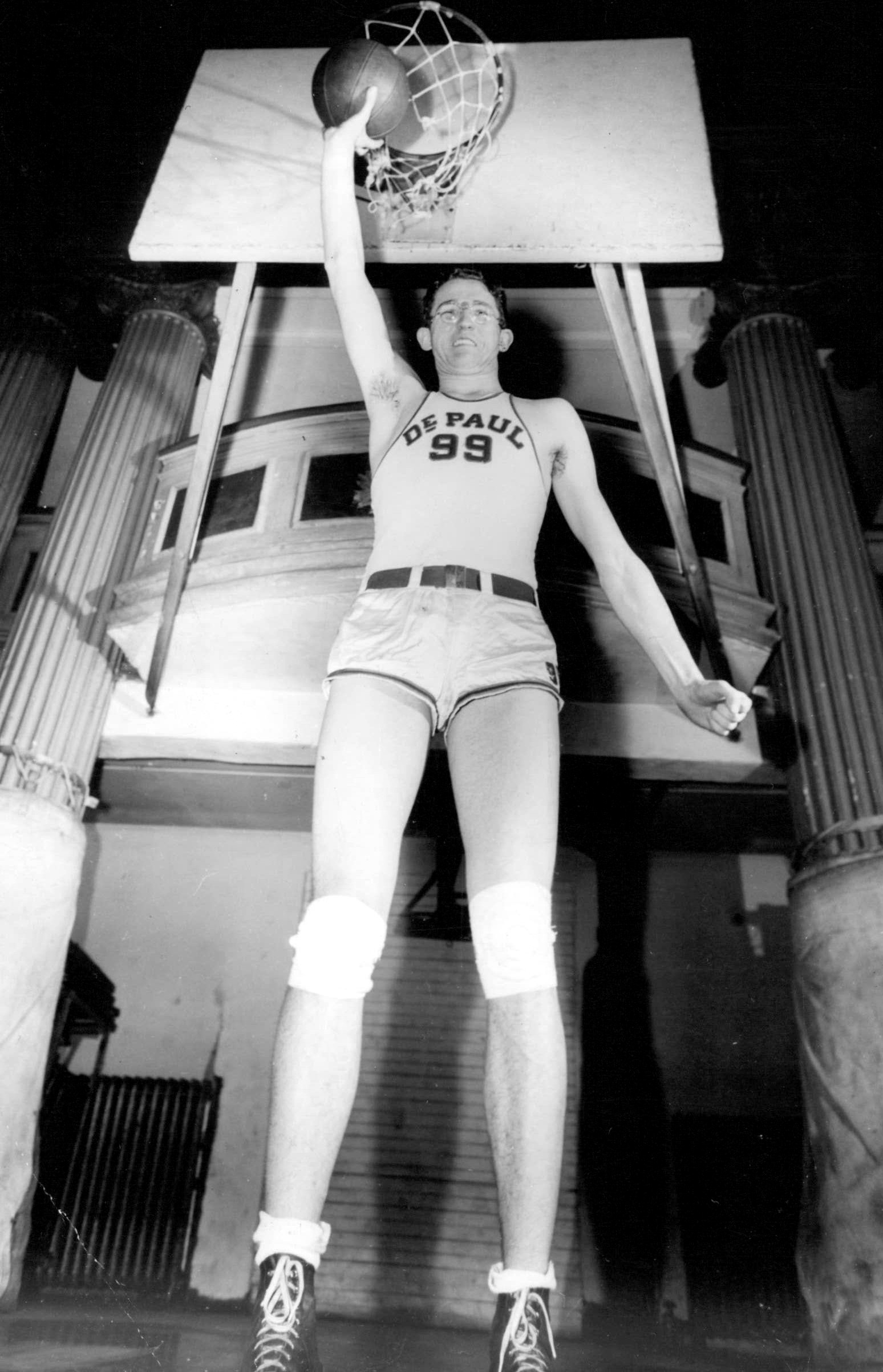
George Mikan, DePaul, 1945

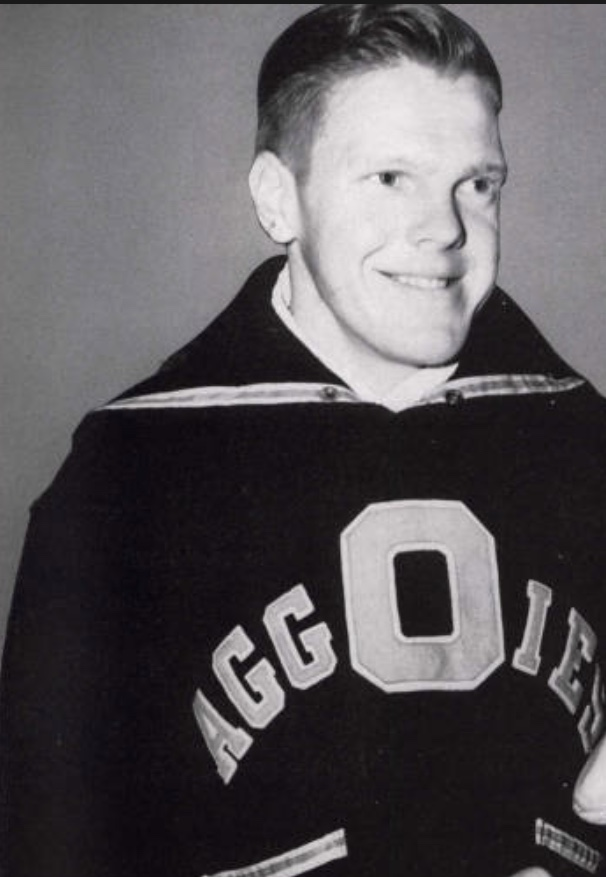
Bob Kurland, Oklahoma State, 1946

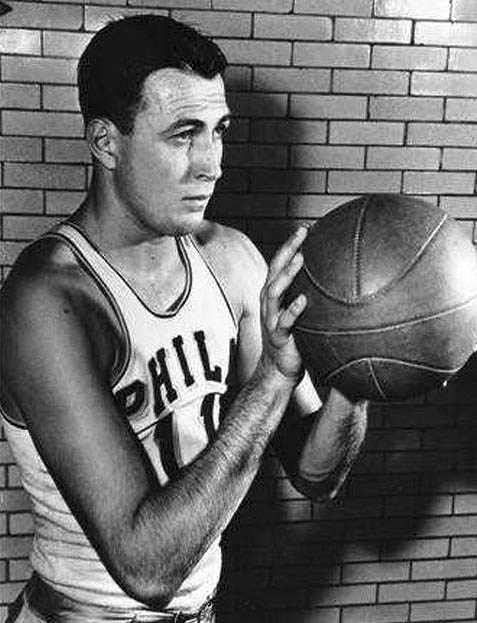
Paul Arizin, Villanova, 1950

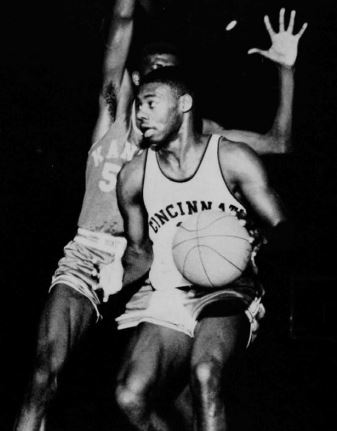
Oscar Robertson, Cincinnati, 1958 through 1960

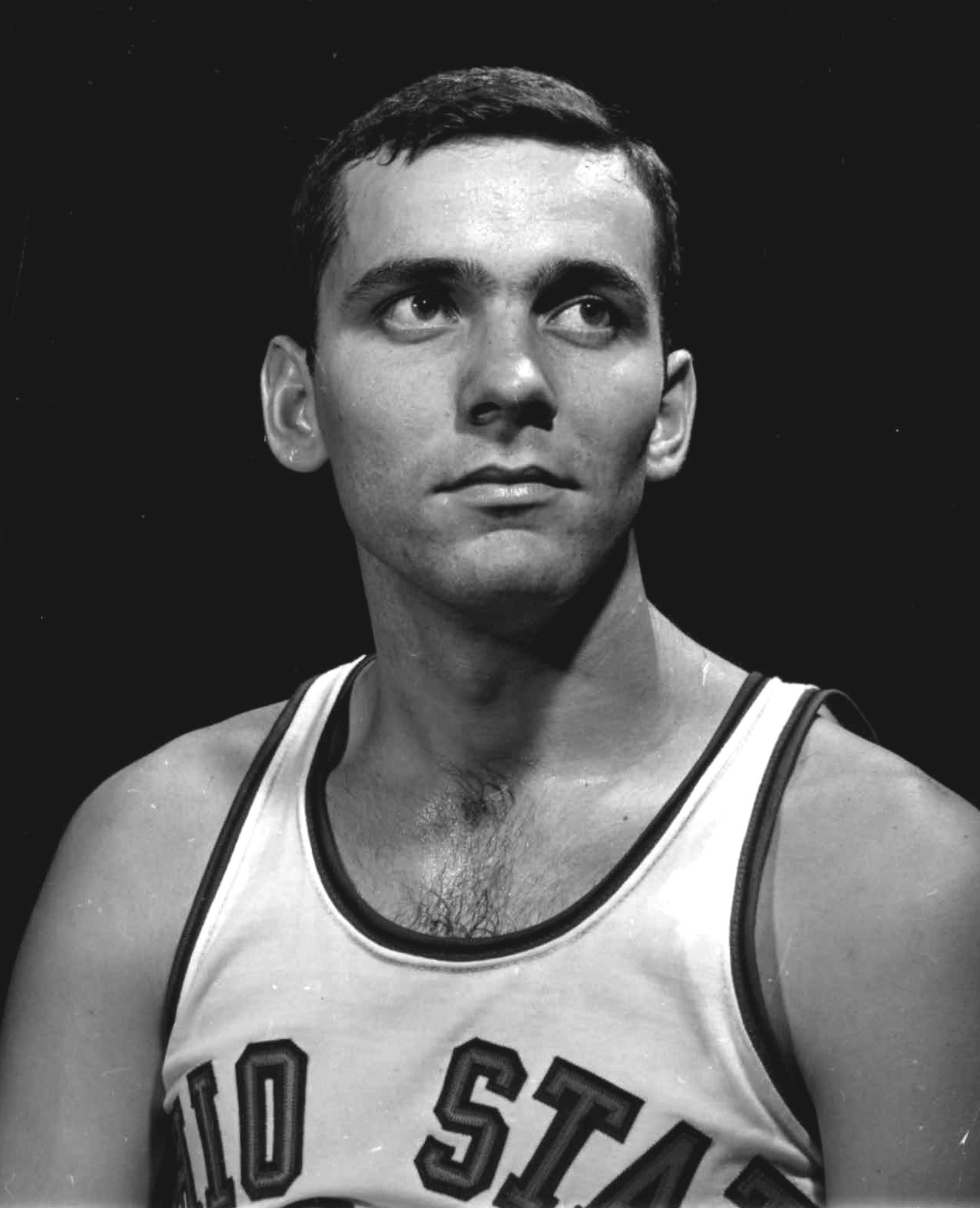
Jerry Lucas, Ohio State, 1961 and 1962

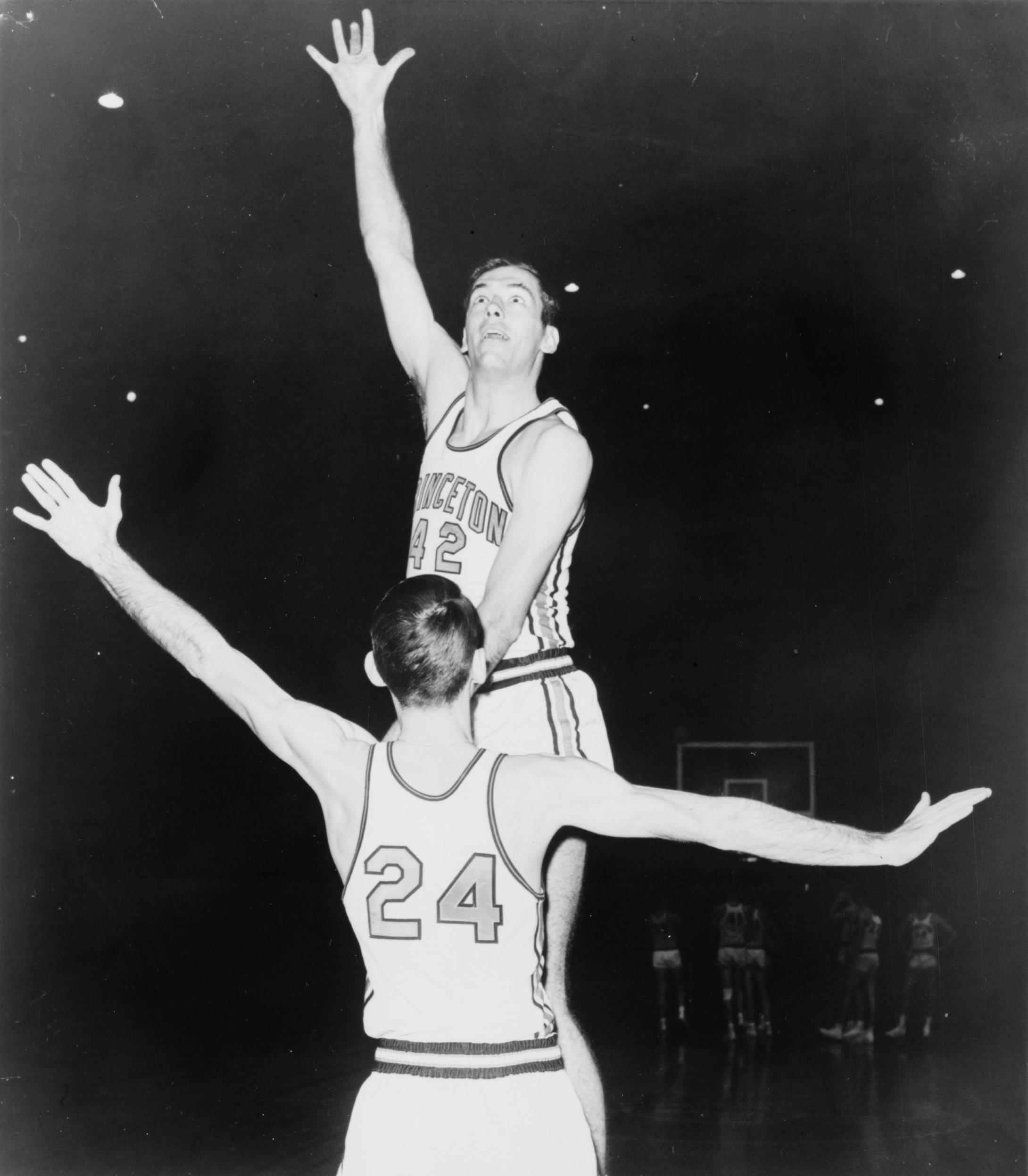
Bill Bradley, Princeton, 1964 and 1965

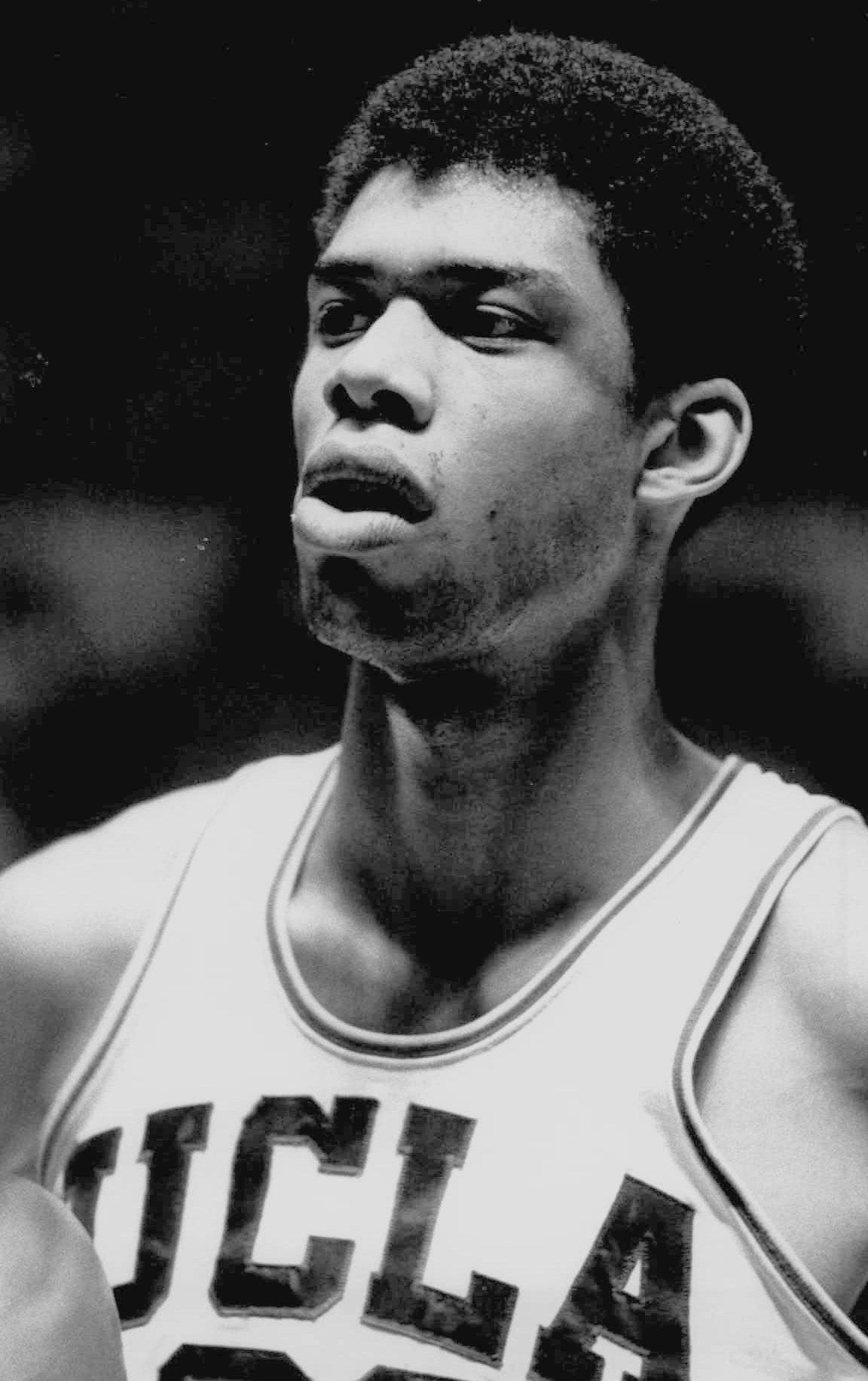
Lew Alcindor,^{[a]} UCLA, 1967 through 1969

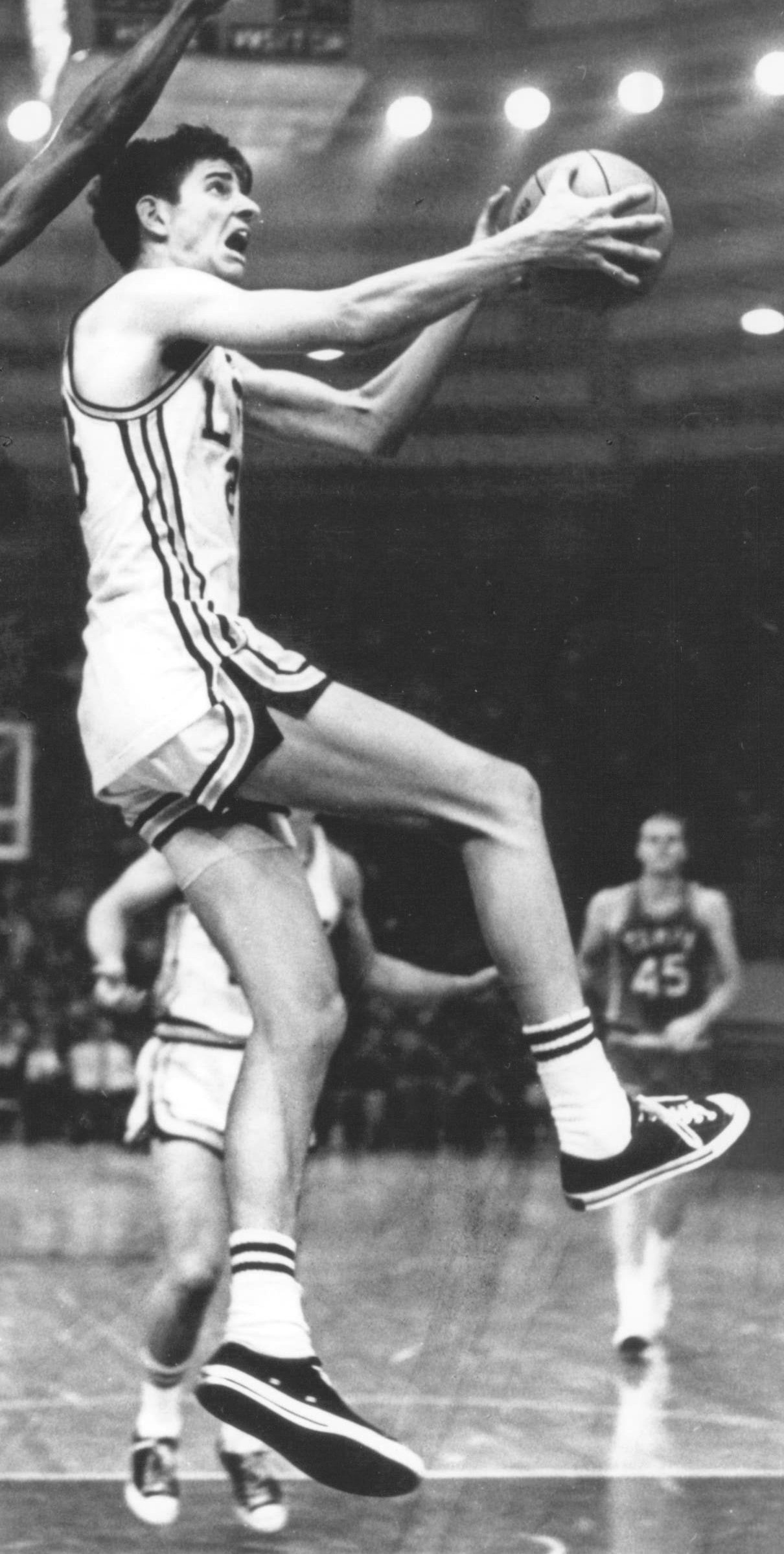
Pete Maravich, LSU, 1969 and 1970

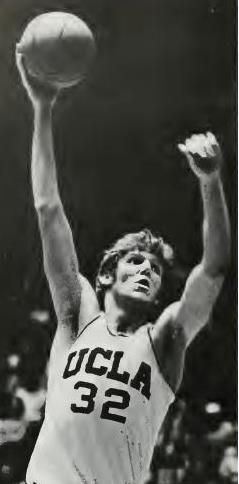
Bill Walton, UCLA, 1972 through 1974

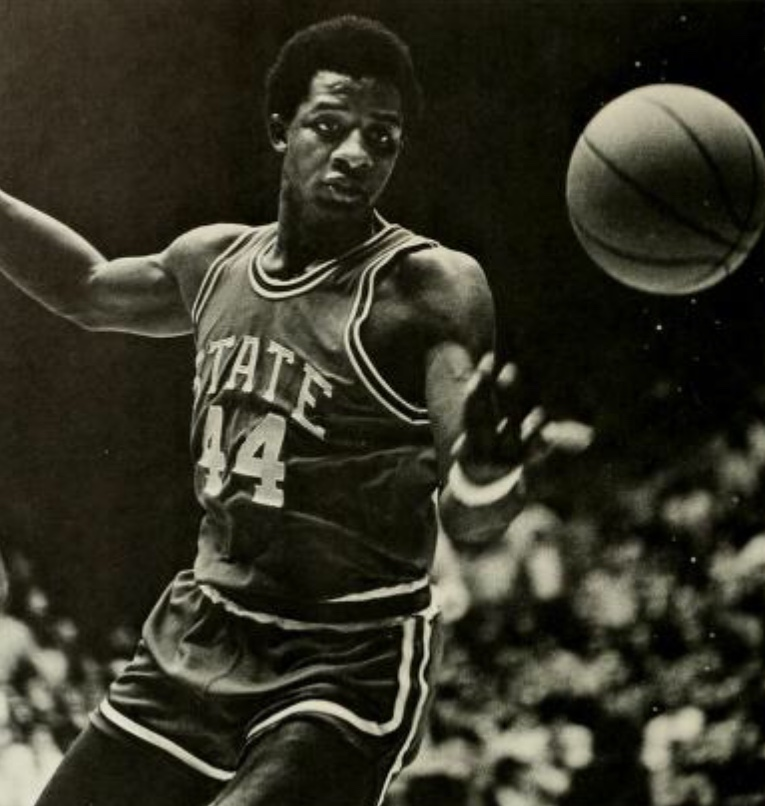
David Thompson, NC State, 1974 and 1975

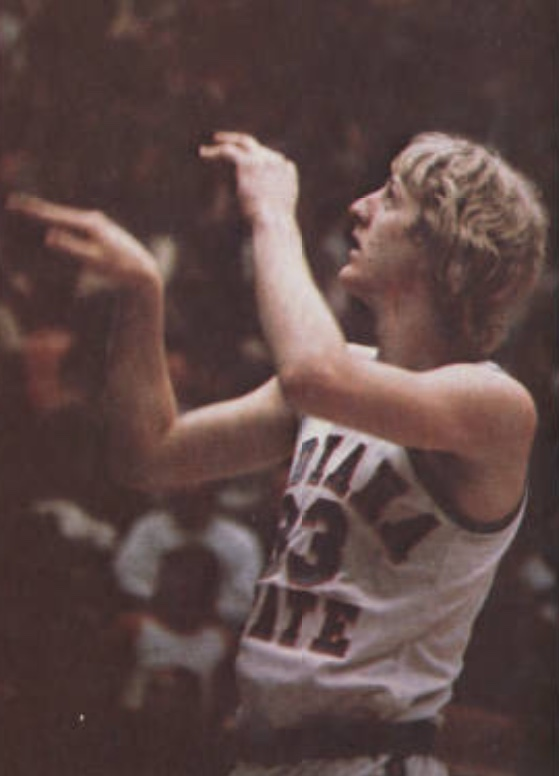
Larry Bird, Indiana State, 1979

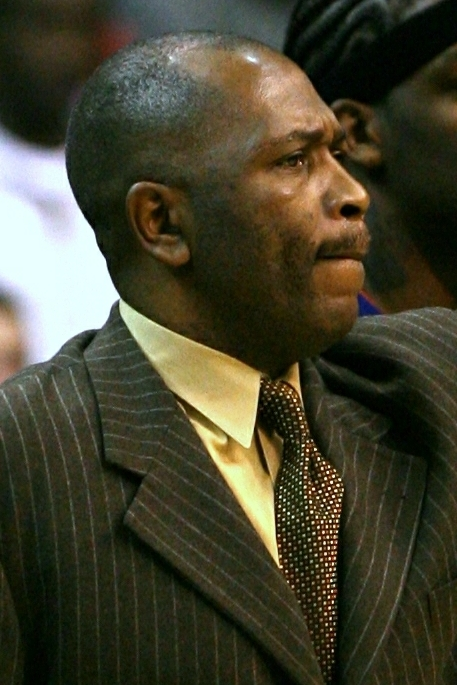
Mark Aguirre, DePaul, 1980 and 1981

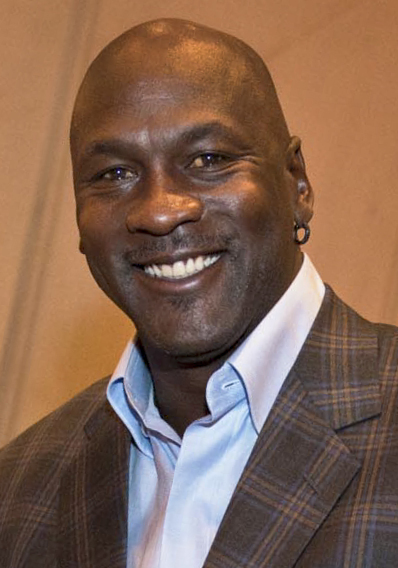
Michael Jordan, North Carolina, 1983 and 1984

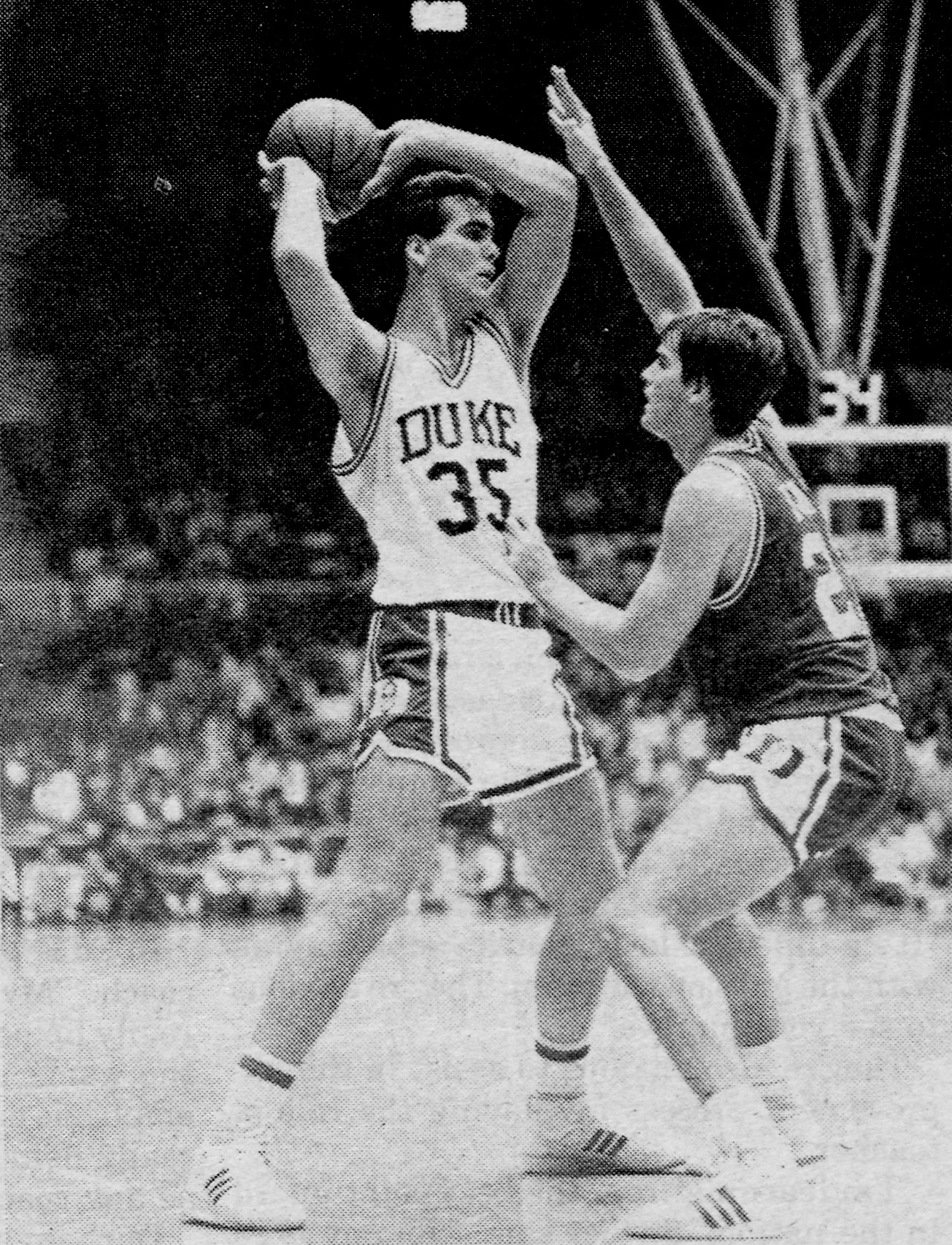
Danny Ferry, Duke, 1989

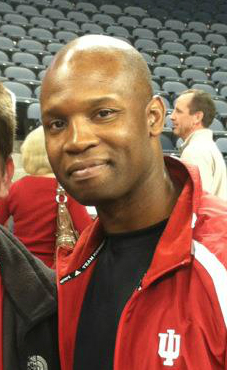
Calbert Cheaney, Indiana, 1993

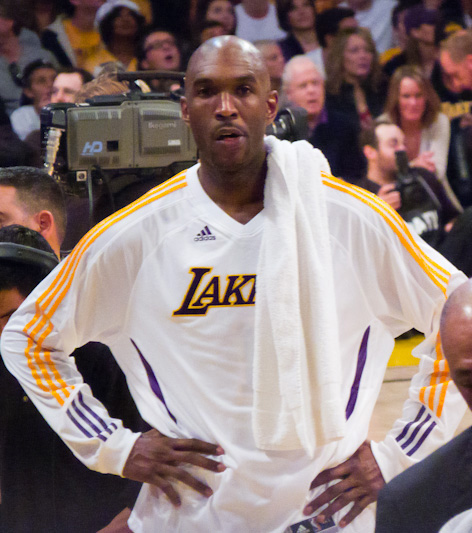
Joe Smith, Maryland, 1995

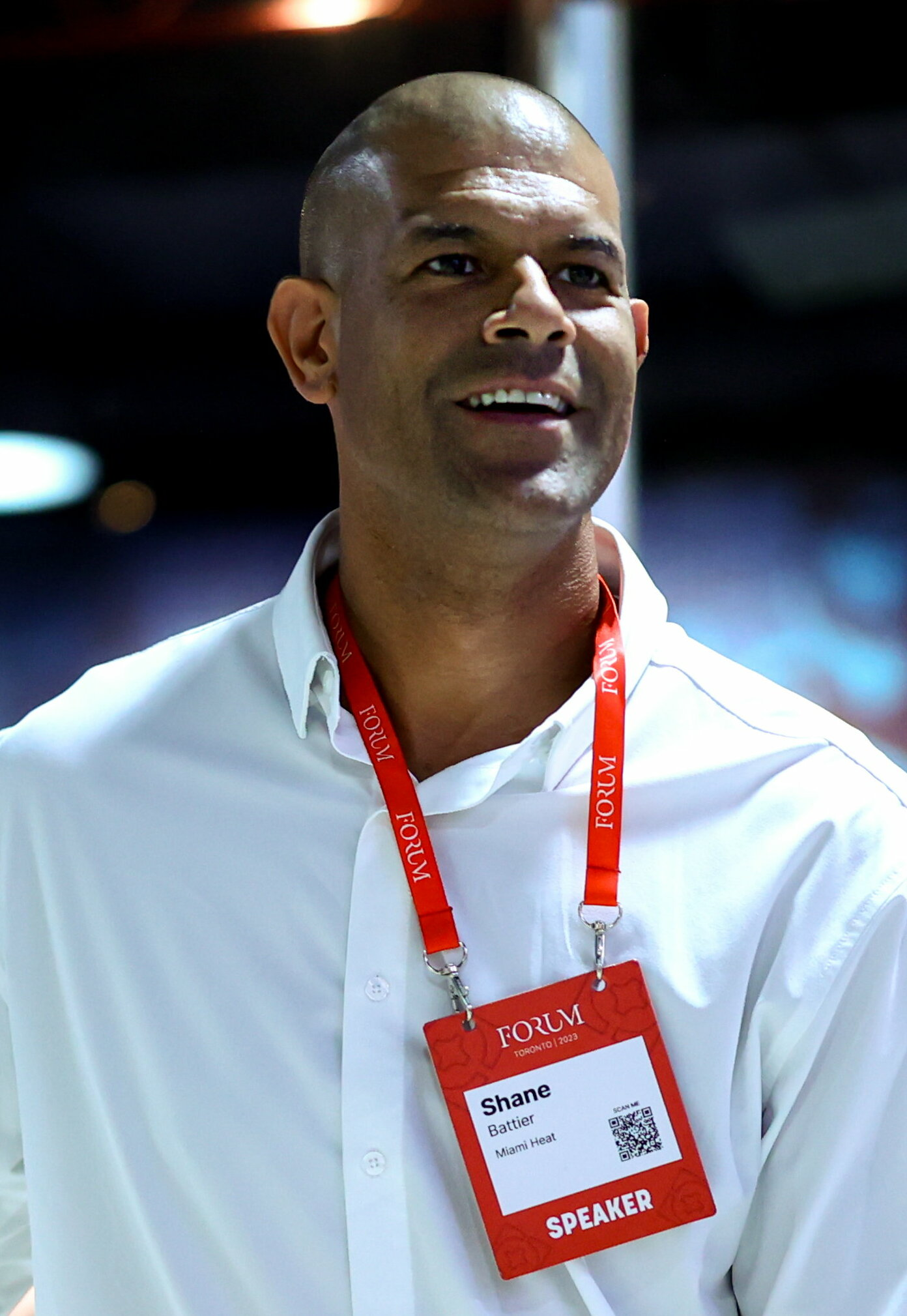
Shane Battier, Duke, 2001

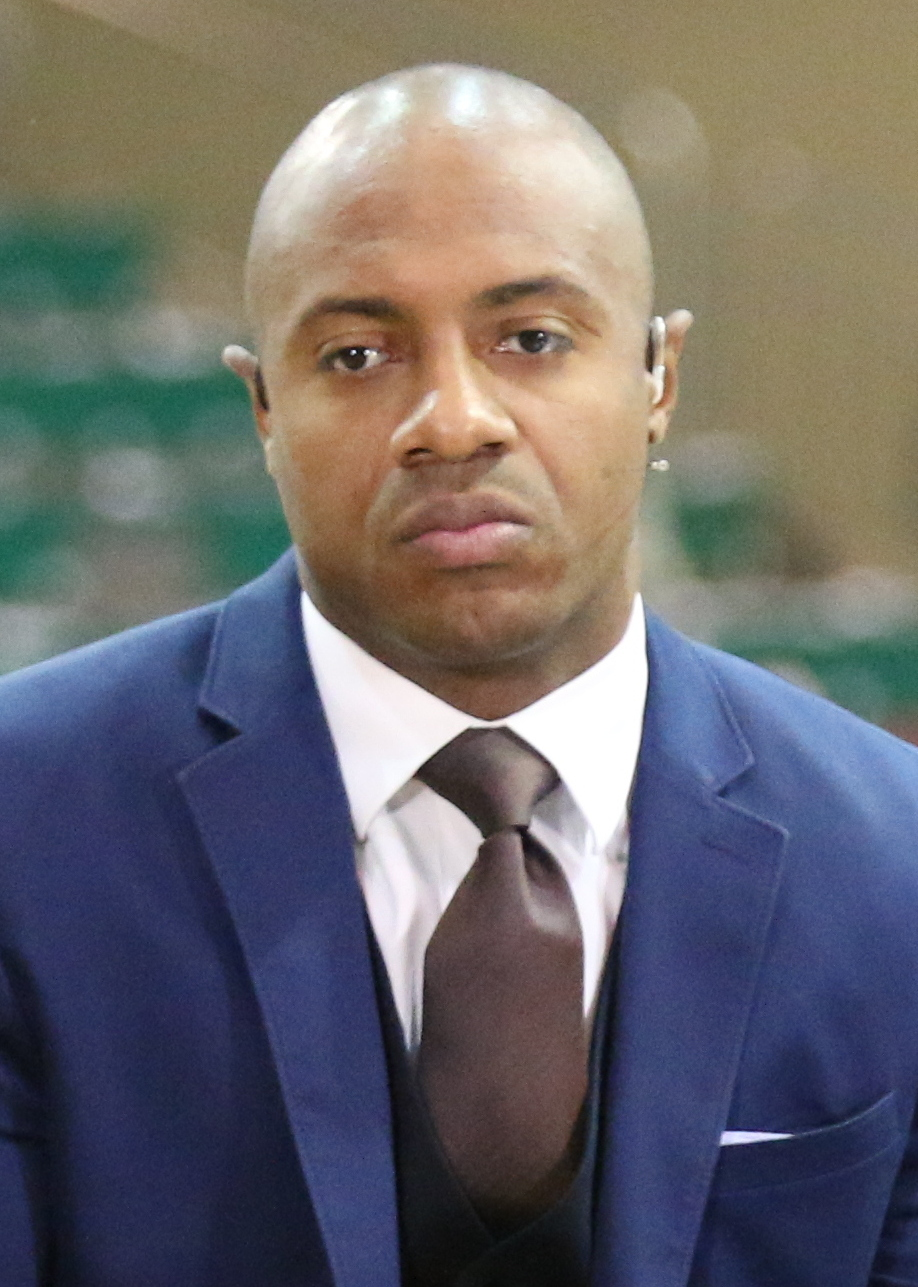
Jay Williams, Duke, 2001 and 2002

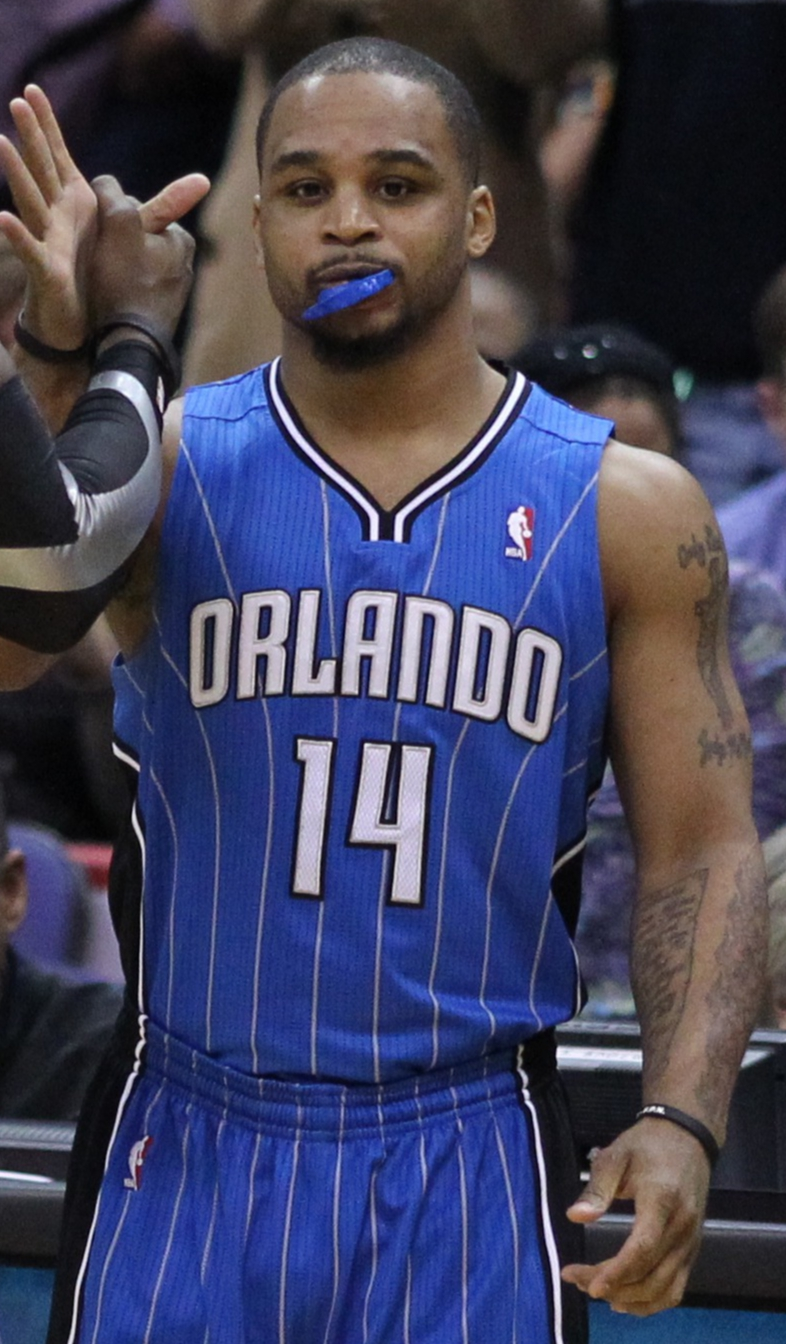
Jameer Nelson, Saint Joseph's, 2004

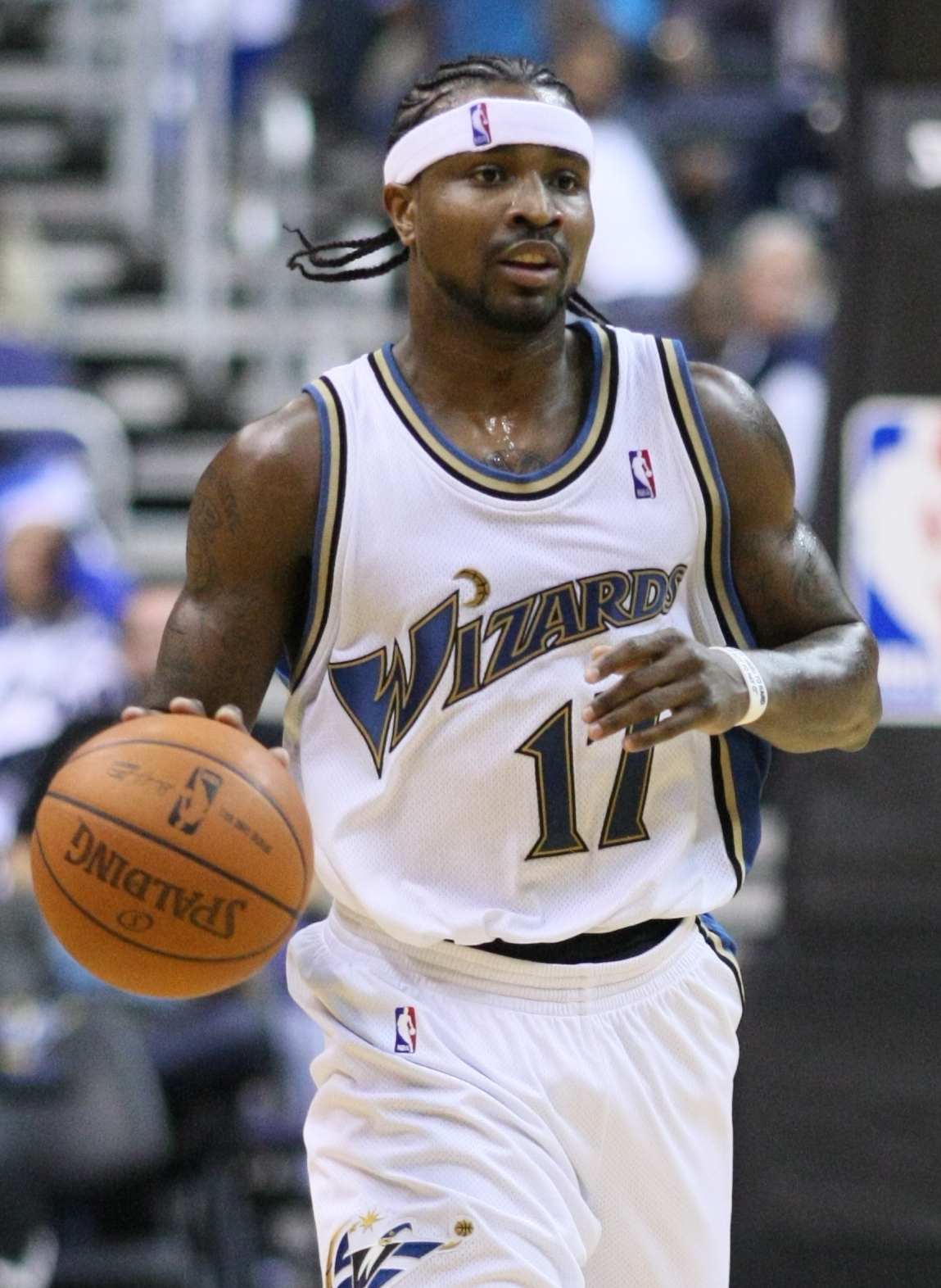
Dee Brown, Illinois, 2005

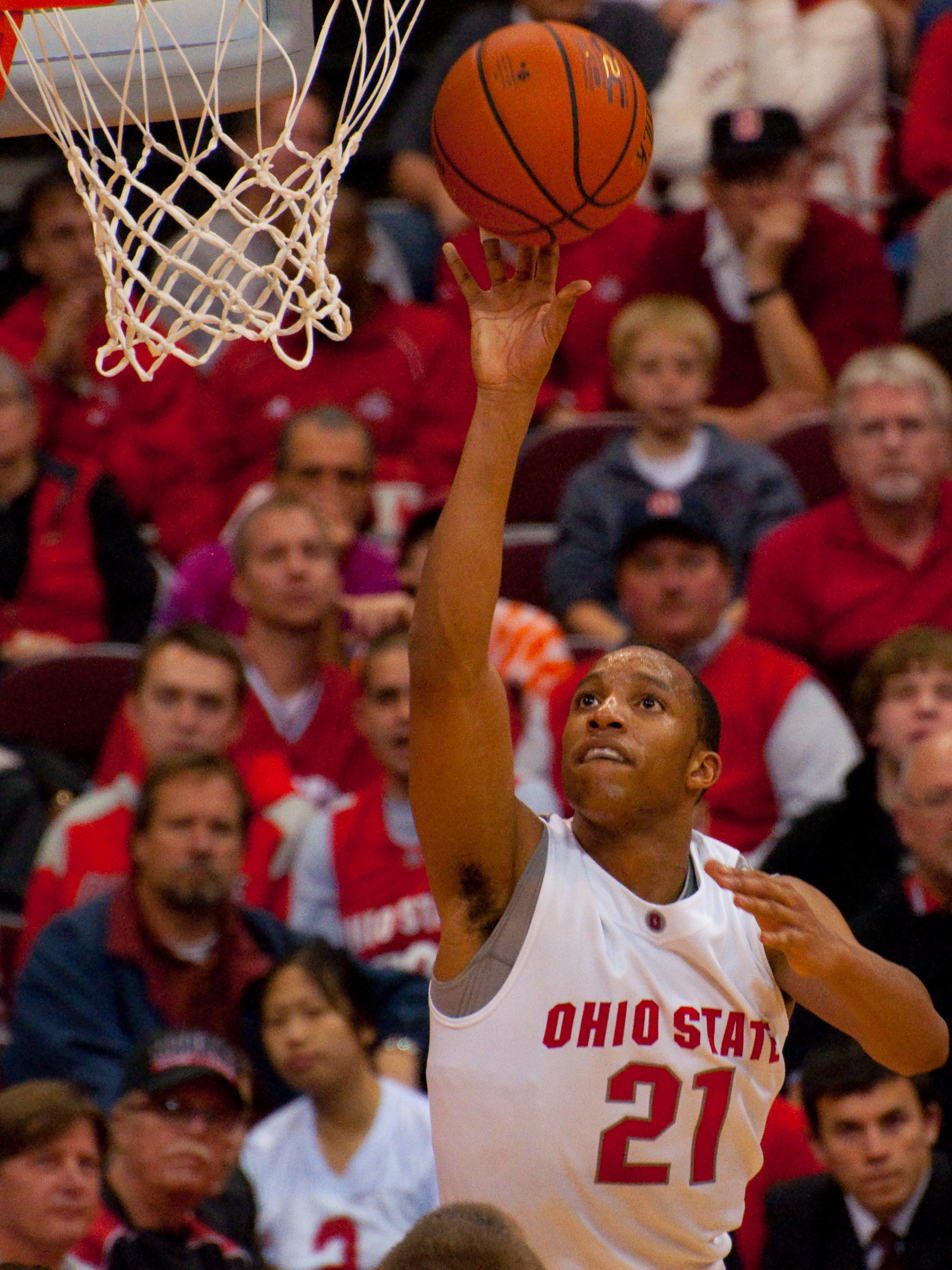
Evan Turner, Ohio State, 2010

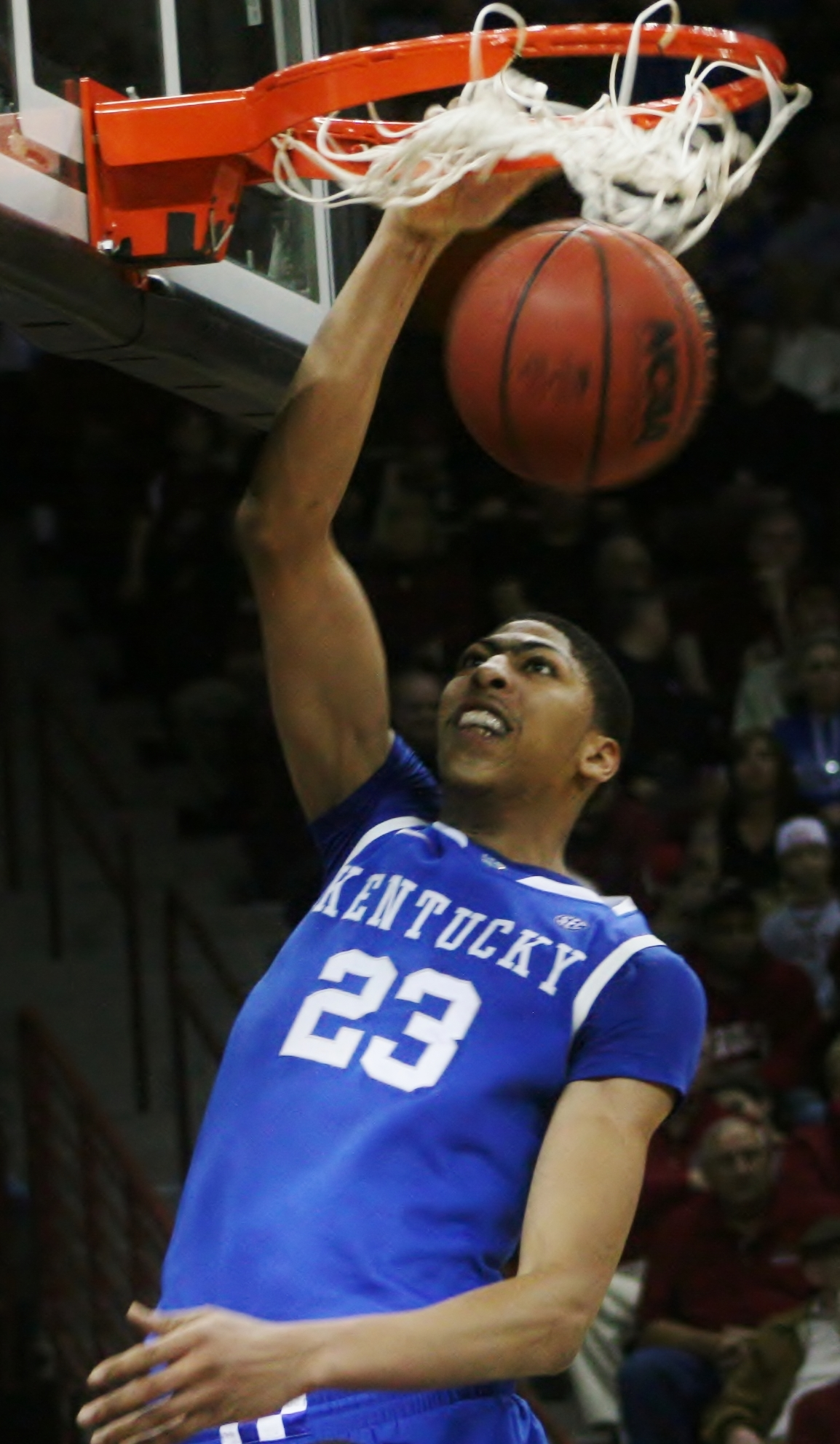
Anthony Davis, Kentucky, 2012

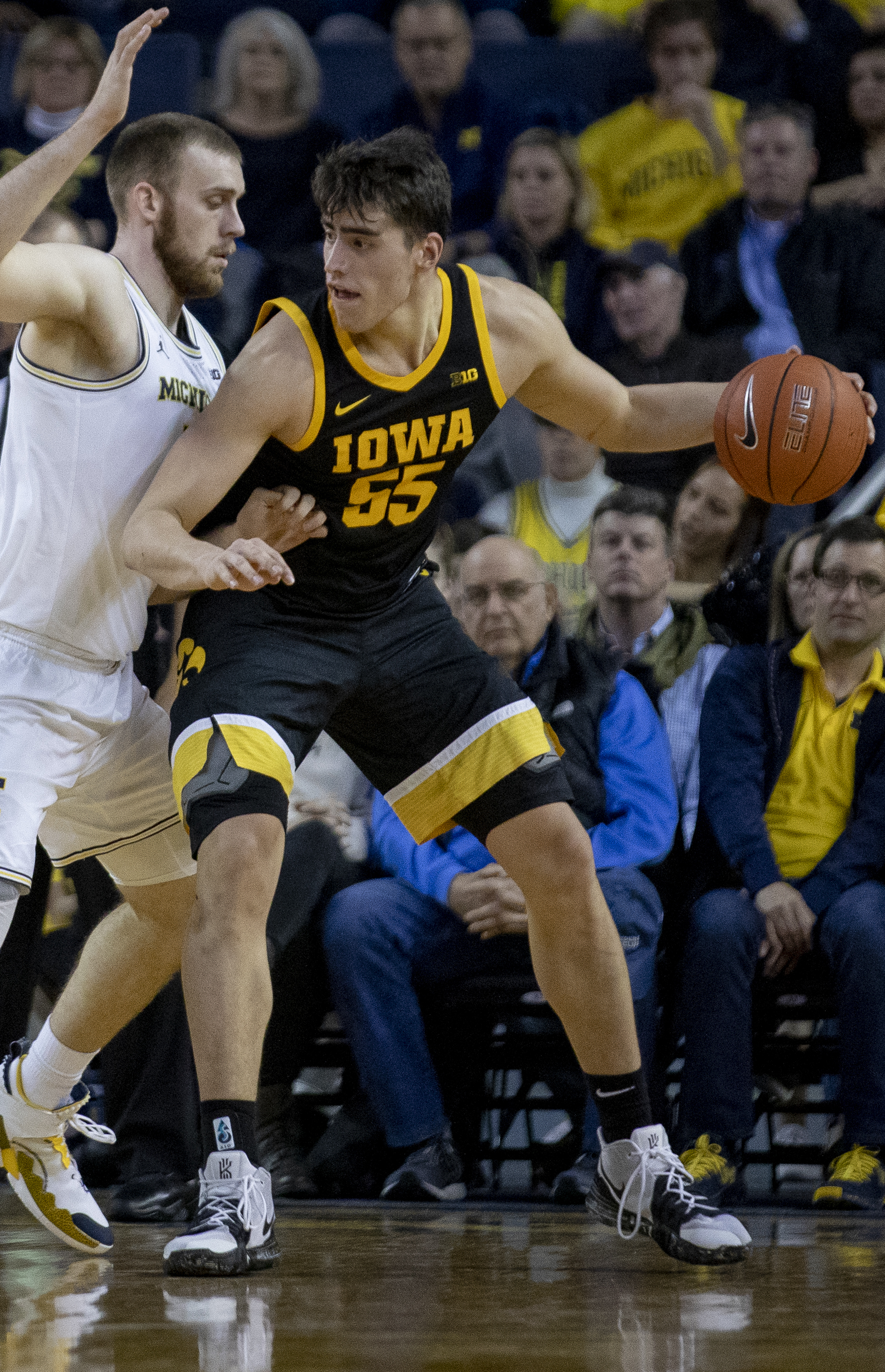
Luka Garza, Iowa, 2020 and 2021

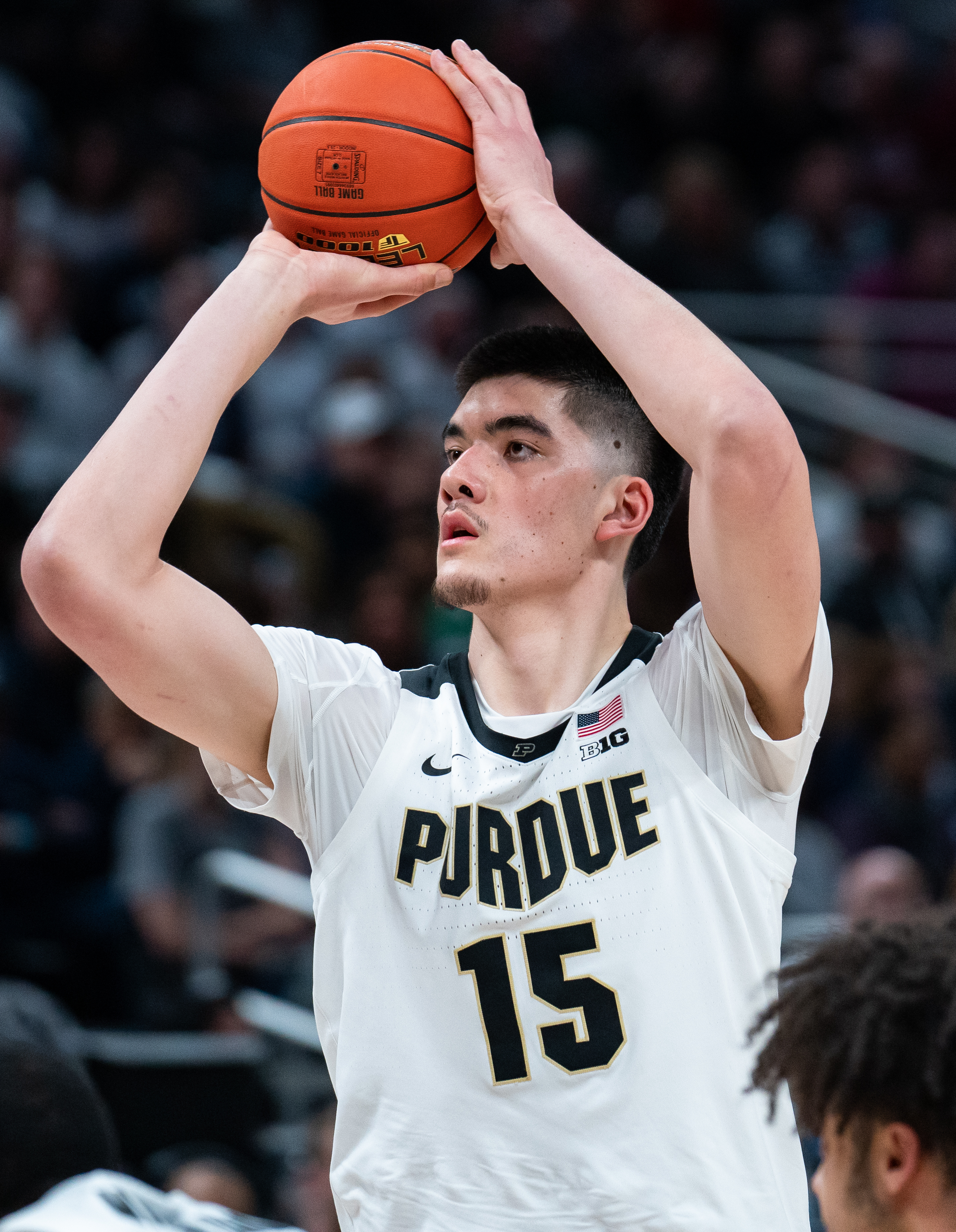
Zach Edey, Purdue, 2023 and 2024

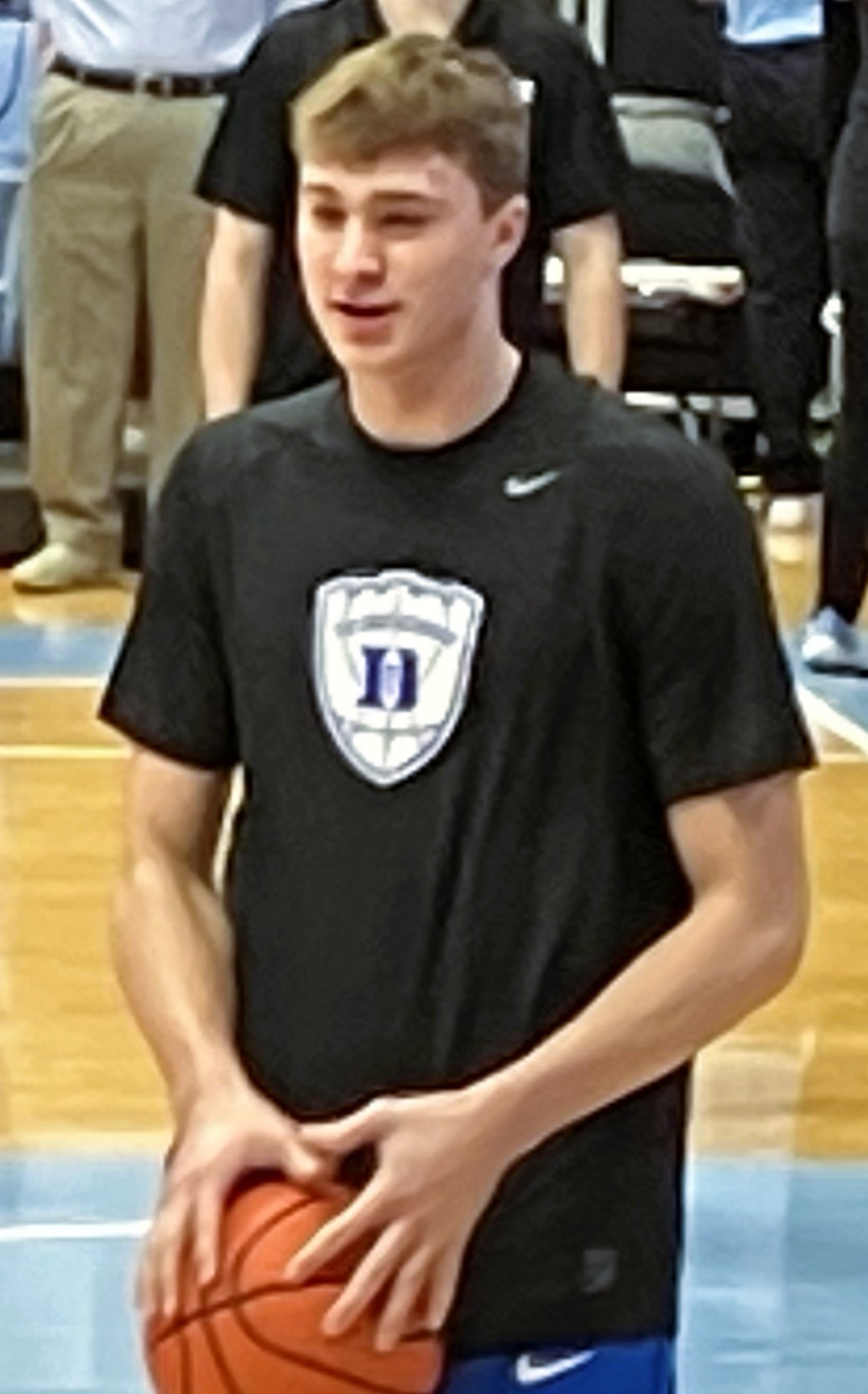
Cooper Flagg, Duke, 2025

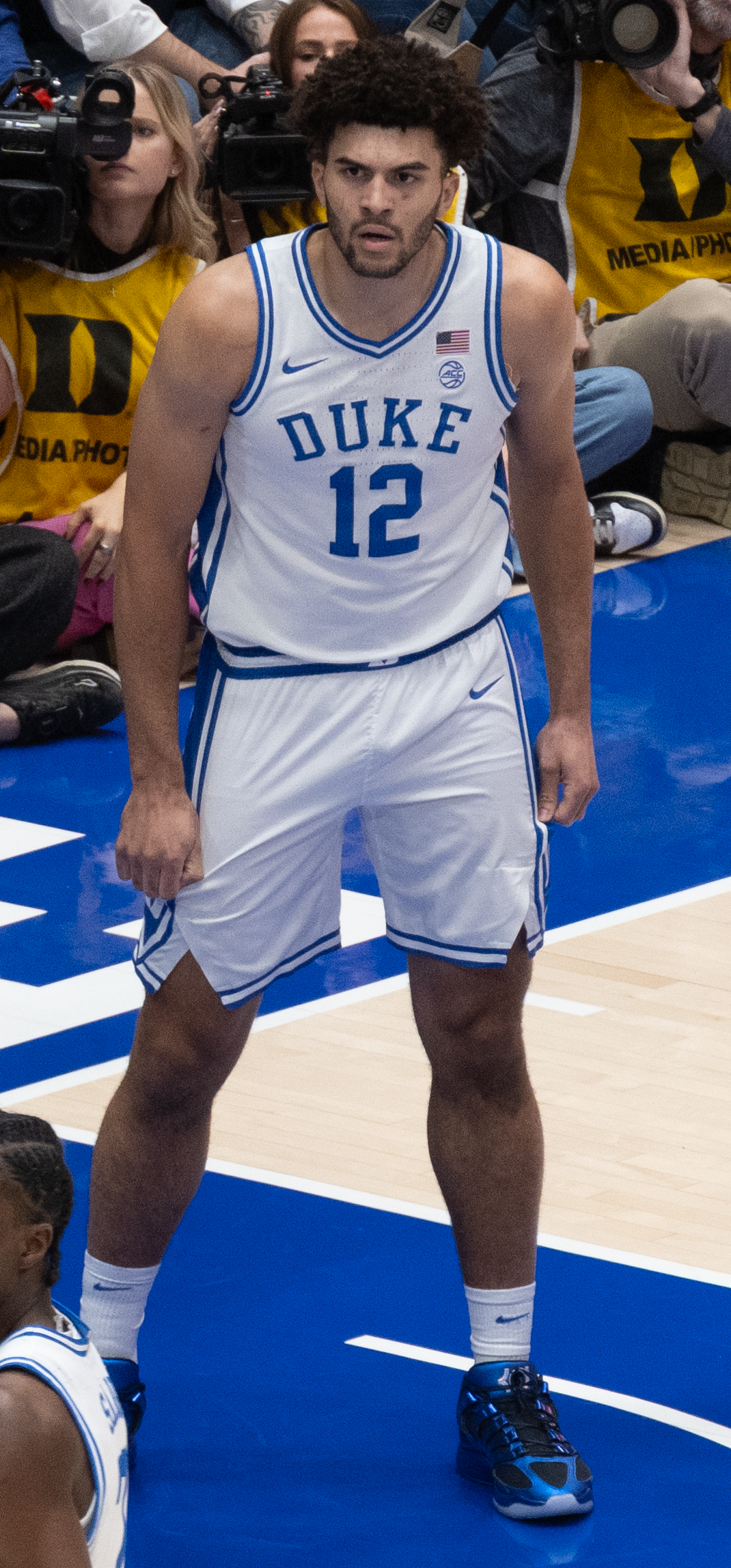
Cameron Boozer, Duke, 2026

Season	Player	School	Class	Sporting News	Oscar Robertson	Associated Press	Naismith	NABC	John Wooden
1942–43	Andy Phillip	Illinois	Senior	✓	No award	No award	No award	No award	No award
1943–44	Dale Hall	Army	Junior	✓	No award	No award	No award	No award	No award
1944–45	George Mikan	DePaul	Junior	✓	No award	No award	No award	No award	No award
1945–46	Bob Kurland	Oklahoma State	Senior	✓	No award	No award	No award	No award	No award
1946–47	No winners selected				No award	No award	No award	No award	No award
1947–48	No winners selected				No award	No award	No award	No award	No award
1948–49	No winners selected				No award	No award	No award	No award	No award
1949–50	Paul Arizin	Villanova	Senior	✓	No award	No award	No award	No award	No award
1950–51	Sherman White	LIU	Senior	✓	No award	No award	No award	No award	No award
1951–52	No winners selected				No award	No award	No award	No award	No award
1952–53	No winners selected				No award	No award	No award	No award	No award
1953–54	No winners selected				No award	No award	No award	No award	No award
1954–55	No winners selected				No award	No award	No award	No award	No award
1955–56	No winners selected				No award	No award	No award	No award	No award
1956–57	No winners selected				No award	No award	No award	No award	No award
1957–58	Oscar Robertson	Cincinnati	Sophomore	✓	No award	No award	No award	No award	No award
1958–59	Oscar Robertson (2)	Cincinnati	Junior	✓	✓	No award	No award	No award	No award
1959–60	Oscar Robertson (3)	Cincinnati	Senior	✓	✓	No award	No award	No award	No award
1960–61	Jerry Lucas	Ohio State	Junior	✓	✓	✓	No award	No award	No award
1961–62	Jerry Lucas (2)	Ohio State	Senior	✓	✓	✓	No award	No award	No award
1962–63	Art Heyman	Duke	Senior	✓	✓	✓	No award	No award	No award
1963–64^{†}	Gary Bradds	Ohio State	Senior	✗	✗	✓	No award	No award	No award
1963–64^{†}	Bill Bradley	Princeton	Junior	✓	✗	✗	No award	No award	No award
1963–64^{†}	Walt Hazzard	UCLA	Senior	✗	✓	✗	No award	No award	No award
1964–65	Bill Bradley (2)	Princeton	Senior	✓	✓	✓	No award	No award	No award
1965–66	Cazzie Russell	Michigan	Senior	✓	✓	✓	No award	No award	No award
1966–67	Lew Alcindor^{[a]}	UCLA	Sophomore	✓	✓	✓	No award	No award	No award
1967–68^{†}	Lew Alcindor^{[a]} (2)	UCLA	Junior	✗	✓	✗	No award	No award	No award
1967–68^{†}	Elvin Hayes	Houston	Senior	✓	✗	✓	No award	No award	No award
1968–69^{†}	Lew Alcindor^{[a]} (3)	UCLA	Senior	✓	✗	✓	✓	No award	No award
1968–69^{†}	Pete Maravich	LSU	Junior	✗	✓	✗	✗	No award	No award
1969–70	Pete Maravich (2)	LSU	Senior	✓	✓	✓	✓	No award	No award
1970–71^{†}	Austin Carr	Notre Dame	Senior	✗	✗	✓	✓	No award	No award
1970–71^{†}	Sidney Wicks	UCLA	Senior	✓	✓	✗	✗	No award	No award
1971–72	Bill Walton	UCLA	Sophomore	✓	✓	✓	✓	No award	No award
1972–73	Bill Walton (2)	UCLA	Junior	✓	✓	✓	✓	No award	No award
1973–74^{†}	David Thompson	NC State	Junior	✗	✗	✓	✗	No award	No award
1973–74^{†}	Bill Walton (3)	UCLA	Senior	✓	✓	✗	✓	No award	No award
1974–75	David Thompson (2)	NC State	Senior	✓	✓	✓	✓	✓	No award
1975–76^{†}	Adrian Dantley	Notre Dame	Junior	✗	✓	✗	✗	✗	No award
1975–76^{†}	Scott May	Indiana	Senior	✓	✗	✓	✓	✓	No award
1976–77	Marques Johnson	UCLA	Senior	✓	✓	✓	✓	✓	✓
1977–78^{†}	Phil Ford	North Carolina	Senior	✓	✓	✗	✗	✓	✓
1977–78^{†}	Butch Lee	Marquette	Senior	✗	✗	✓	✓	✗	✗
1978–79	Larry Bird	Indiana State	Senior	✓	✓	✓	✓	✓	✓
1979–80^{†}	Mark Aguirre	DePaul	Sophomore	✗	✓	✓	✓	✗	✗
1979–80^{†}	Michael Brooks	La Salle	Senior	✗	✗	✗	✗	✓	✗
1979–80^{†}	Darrell Griffith	Louisville	Senior	✓	✗	✗	✗	✗	✓
1980–81^{†}	Mark Aguirre (2)	DePaul	Junior	✓	✗	✗	✗	✗	✗
1980–81^{†}	Danny Ainge	BYU	Senior	✗	✗	✗	✗	✓	✓
1980–81^{†}	Ralph Sampson	Virginia	Sophomore	✗	✓	✓	✓	✗	✗
1981–82	Ralph Sampson (2)	Virginia	Junior	✓	✓	✓	✓	✓	✓
1982–83^{†}	Michael Jordan	North Carolina	Sophomore	✓	✗	✗	✗	✗	✗
1982–83^{†}	Ralph Sampson (3)	Virginia	Senior	✗	✓	✓	✓	✓	✓
1983–84	Michael Jordan (2)	North Carolina	Junior	✓	✓	✓	✓	✓	✓
1984–85^{†}	Patrick Ewing	Georgetown	Senior	✓	✗	✓	✓	✓	✗
1984–85^{†}	Chris Mullin	St. John's	Senior	✗	✓	✗	✗	✗	✓
1985–86^{†}	Walter Berry	St. John's	Senior	✓	✓	✓	✗	✓	✓
1985–86^{†}	Johnny Dawkins	Duke	Senior	✗	✗	✗	✓	✗	✗
1986–87	David Robinson	Navy	Senior	✓	✓	✓	✓	✓	✓
1987–88^{†}	Hersey Hawkins	Bradley	Senior	✓	✓	✓	✗	✗	✗
1987–88^{†}	Danny Manning	Kansas	Senior	✗	✗	✗	✓	✓	✓
1988–89^{†}	Sean Elliott	Arizona	Senior	✗	✗	✓	✗	✓	✓
1988–89^{†}	Danny Ferry	Duke	Senior	✗	✓	✗	✓	✗	✗
1988–89^{†}	Stacey King	Oklahoma	Senior	✓	✗	✗	✗	✗	✗
1989–90^{†}	Dennis Scott	Georgia Tech	Junior	✓	✗	✗	✗	✗	✗
1989–90^{†}	Lionel Simmons	La Salle	Senior	✗	✓	✓	✓	✓	✓
1990–91^{†}	Larry Johnson	UNLV	Senior	✓	✓	✗	✓	✓	✓
1990–91^{†}	Shaquille O'Neal	LSU	Sophomore	✗	✗	✓	✗	✗	✗
1991–92	Christian Laettner	Duke	Senior	✓	✓	✓	✓	✓	✓
1992–93	Calbert Cheaney	Indiana	Senior	✓	✓	✓	✓	✓	✓
1993–94	Glenn Robinson	Purdue	Junior	✓	✓	✓	✓	✓	✓
1994–95^{†}	Ed O'Bannon	UCLA	Senior	✗	✓	✗	✗	✗	✓
1994–95^{†}	Shawn Respert	Michigan State	Senior	✓	✗	✗	✗	✓	✗
1994–95^{†}	Joe Smith	Maryland	Sophomore	✗	✗	✓	✓	✗	✗
1995–96	Marcus Camby	UMass	Junior	✓	✓	✓	✓	✓	✓
1996–97	Tim Duncan	Wake Forest	Senior	✓	✓	✓	✓	✓	✓
1997–98	Antawn Jamison	North Carolina	Junior	✓	✓	✓	✓	✓	✓
1998–99	Elton Brand	Duke	Sophomore	✓	✓	✓	✓	✓	✓
1999–00	Kenyon Martin	Cincinnati	Senior	✓	✓	✓	✓	✓	✓
2000–01^{†}	Shane Battier	Duke	Senior	✓	✓	✓	✓	✗	✓
2000–01^{†}	Jay Williams	Duke	Sophomore	✗	✗	✗	✗	✓	✗
2001–02^{†}	Drew Gooden	Kansas	Junior	✗	✗	✗	✗	✓ ^{T}	✗
2001–02^{†}	Jay Williams (2)	Duke	Junior	✓	✓	✓	✓	✓ ^{T}	✓
2002–03^{†}	Nick Collison	Kansas	Senior	✗	✗	✗	✗	✓	✗
2002–03^{†}	T. J. Ford	Texas	Sophomore	✓	✗	✗	✓	✗	✓
2002–03^{†}	David West	Xavier	Senior	✗	✓	✓	✗	✗	✗
2003–04^{†}	Jameer Nelson	Saint Joseph's	Senior	✓	✓	✓	✓	✓ ^{T}	✓
2003–04^{†}	Emeka Okafor	UConn	Junior	✗	✗	✗	✗	✓ ^{T}	✗
2004–05^{†}	Andrew Bogut	Utah	Sophomore	✗	✓	✓	✓	✓	✓
2004–05^{†}	Dee Brown	Illinois	Junior	✓	✗	✗	✗	✗	✗
2005–06^{†}	Adam Morrison	Gonzaga	Junior	✗	✓ ^{T}	✗	✗	✓ ^{T}	✗
2005–06^{†}	JJ Redick	Duke	Senior	✓	✓ ^{T}	✓	✓	✓ ^{T}	✓
2006–07	Kevin Durant	Texas	Freshman	✓	✓	✓	✓	✓	✓
2007–08	Tyler Hansbrough	North Carolina	Junior	✓	✓	✓	✓	✓	✓
2008–09	Blake Griffin	Oklahoma	Sophomore	✓	✓	✓	✓	✓	✓
2009–10	Evan Turner	Ohio State	Junior	✓	✓	✓	✓	✓	✓
2010–11	Jimmer Fredette	BYU	Senior	✓	✓	✓	✓	✓	✓
2011–12^{†}	Anthony Davis	Kentucky	Freshman	✓	✓	✓	✓	✗	✓
2011–12^{†}	Draymond Green	Michigan State	Senior	✗	✗	✗	✗	✓	✗
2012–13^{†}	Trey Burke	Michigan	Sophomore	✗	✓	✓	✓	✓	✓
2012–13^{†}	Victor Oladipo	Indiana	Junior	✓	✗	✗	✗	✗	✗
2013–14	Doug McDermott	Creighton	Senior	✓	✓	✓	✓	✓	✓
2014–15	Frank Kaminsky	Wisconsin	Senior	✓	✓	✓	✓	✓	✓
2015–16^{†}	Buddy Hield	Oklahoma	Senior	✓	✓	✗	✓	✗	✓
2015–16^{†}	Denzel Valentine	Michigan State	Senior	✗	✗	✓	✗	✓	✗
2016–17	Frank Mason III	Kansas	Senior	✓	✓	✓	✓	✓	✓
2017–18	Jalen Brunson	Villanova	Junior	✓	✓	✓	✓	✓	✓
2018–19	Zion Williamson	Duke	Freshman	✓	✓	✓	✓	✓	✓
2019–20^{†}	Luka Garza	Iowa	Junior	✓	✗	✗	✗	✗	✗
2019–20^{†}	Obi Toppin	Dayton	Sophomore	✗	✓	✓	✓	✓	✓
2020–21	Luka Garza (2)	Iowa	Senior	✓	✓	✓	✓	✓	✓
2021–22	Oscar Tshiebwe	Kentucky	Junior	✓	✓	✓	✓	✓	✓
2022–23	Zach Edey	Purdue	Junior	✓	✓	✓	✓	✓	✓
2023–24	Zach Edey (2)	Purdue	Senior	✓	✓	✓	✓	✓	✓
2024–25^{†}	Johni Broome	Auburn	Senior	✓	✗	✗	✗	✗	✗
2024–25^{†}	Cooper Flagg	Duke	Freshman	✗	✓	✓	✓	✓	✓
2025–26	Cameron Boozer	Duke	Freshman	✓	✓	✓	✓	✓	✓

- ^{a} Lew Alcindor later changed his named to Kareem Abdul-Jabbar.

== See also ==
- List of U.S. men's college basketball national coach of the year awards
