= Basketball Times Coach of the Year =

College basketball coach award

Basketball Times National Coach of the Year
- Awarded for: the best men's college basketball head coach in NCAA Division I competition
- Country: United States
- Presented by: Basketball Times

History
- First award: 1982
- Final award: 2021

The Basketball Times National Coach of the Year Award was established in 1982 to recognize the best men's college basketball coach by Basketball Times magazine. It was considered a major national coach of the year honor by the National Collegiate Athletic Association (NCAA), and the winners are still published in the annually updated NCAA Division I men's basketball media guides. The print magazine ceased operations in 2021 while a spinoff, online-only continuation CollegeBasketballTimes.com carried on. Although the website has exclusive rights to Basketball Times' entire print catalog, the website's awards and status are not recognized by the NCAA, effectively ending the selector's influence with the print magazine's 2021 folding.

Seven coaches won the award twice each: Jerry Tarkanian (1984, 1990), Mike Krzyzewski (1986, 1997), Bob Knight (1989, 2002), Mike Montgomery (2000, 2004), John Calipari (1996, 2015), Chris Mack (2016, 2018), and Mark Few (2013, 2021). The only two coaches to have won a national championship in the same season he was named the Basketball Times National Coach of the Year are Tarkanian of UNLV (1990) and Dean Smith of North Carolina (1993).

== Key ==
| Coach (X) | Denotes the number of times the coach has been awarded the Basketball Times Coach of the Year Award at that point |
| W, L, W % | Total wins, total losses, win percentage |
| Finish | National postseason tournament result |
| C | Denotes national championship season |

== Winners ==
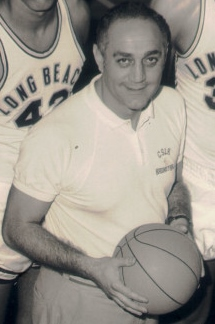
Jerry Tarkanian, UNLV, 1984 and 1990

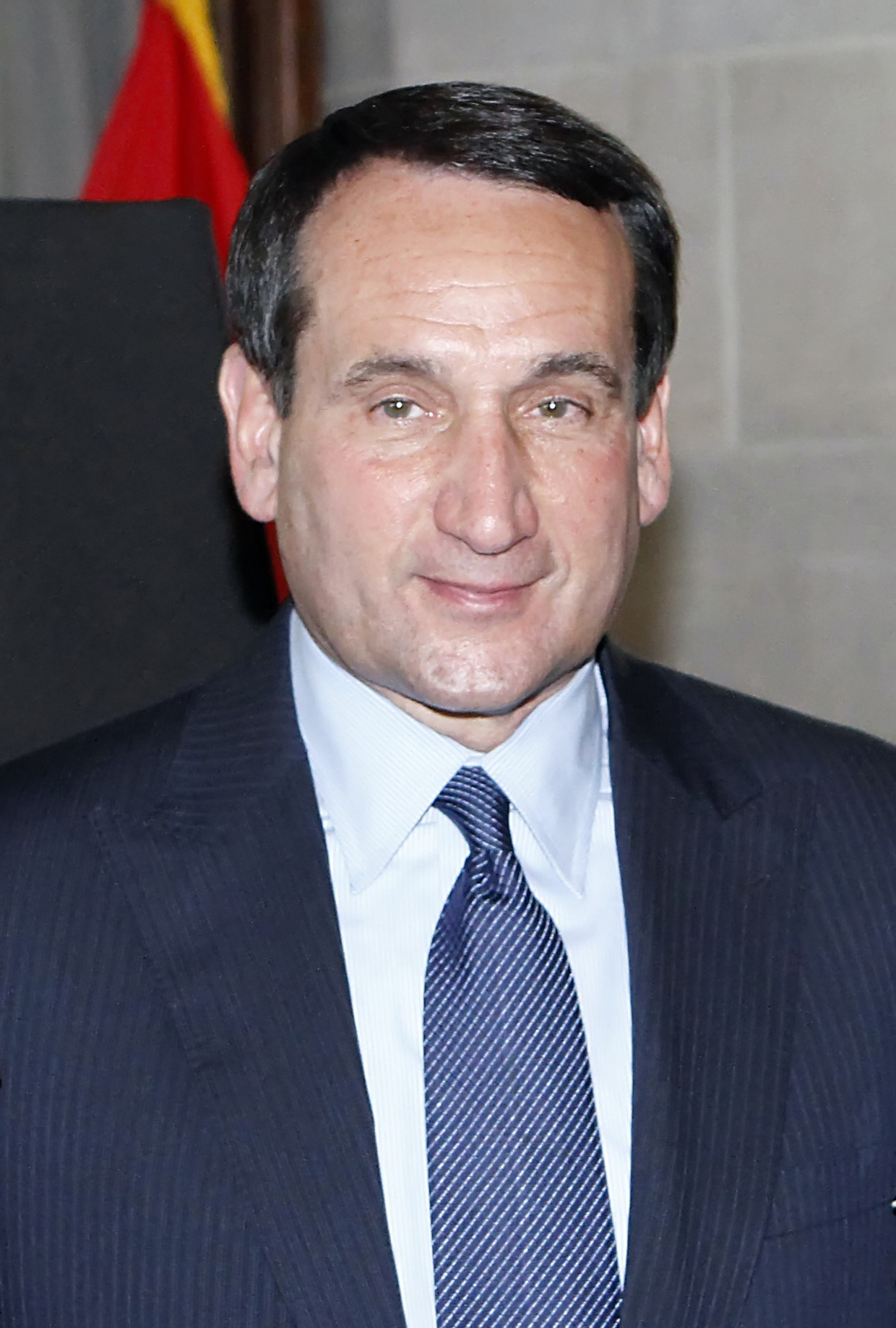
Mike Krzyzewski, Duke, 1986 and 1997

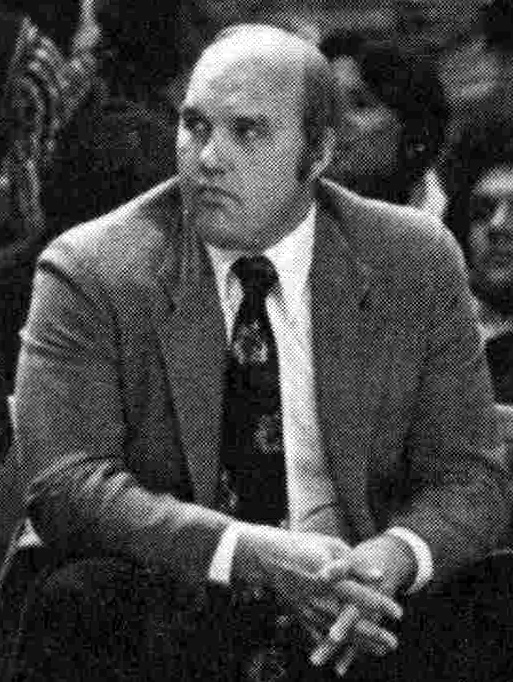
Rick Majerus, Utah, 1991

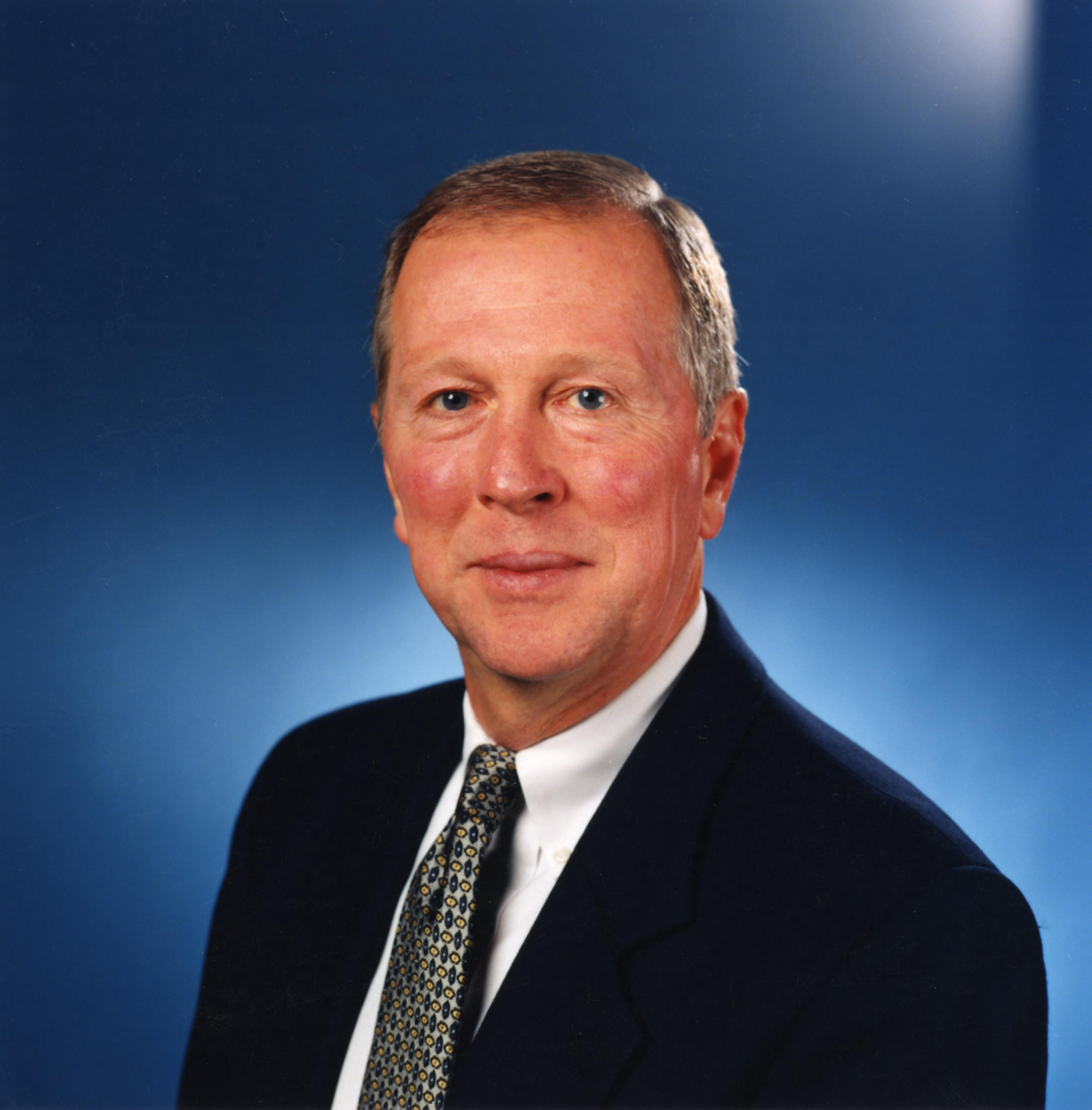
Steve Fisher, Michigan, 1992

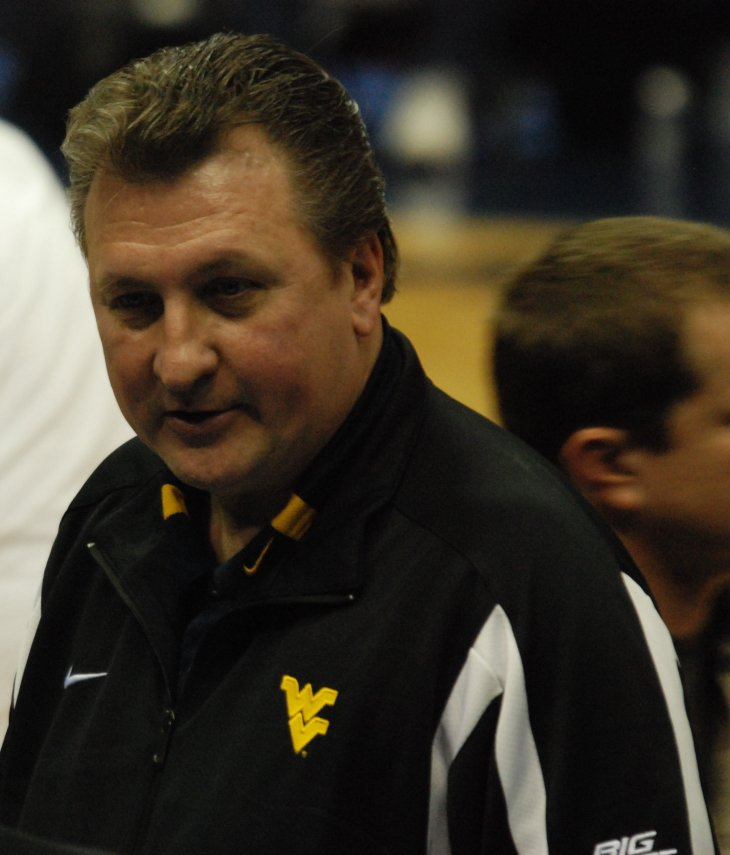
Bob Huggins, Cincinnati, 1998

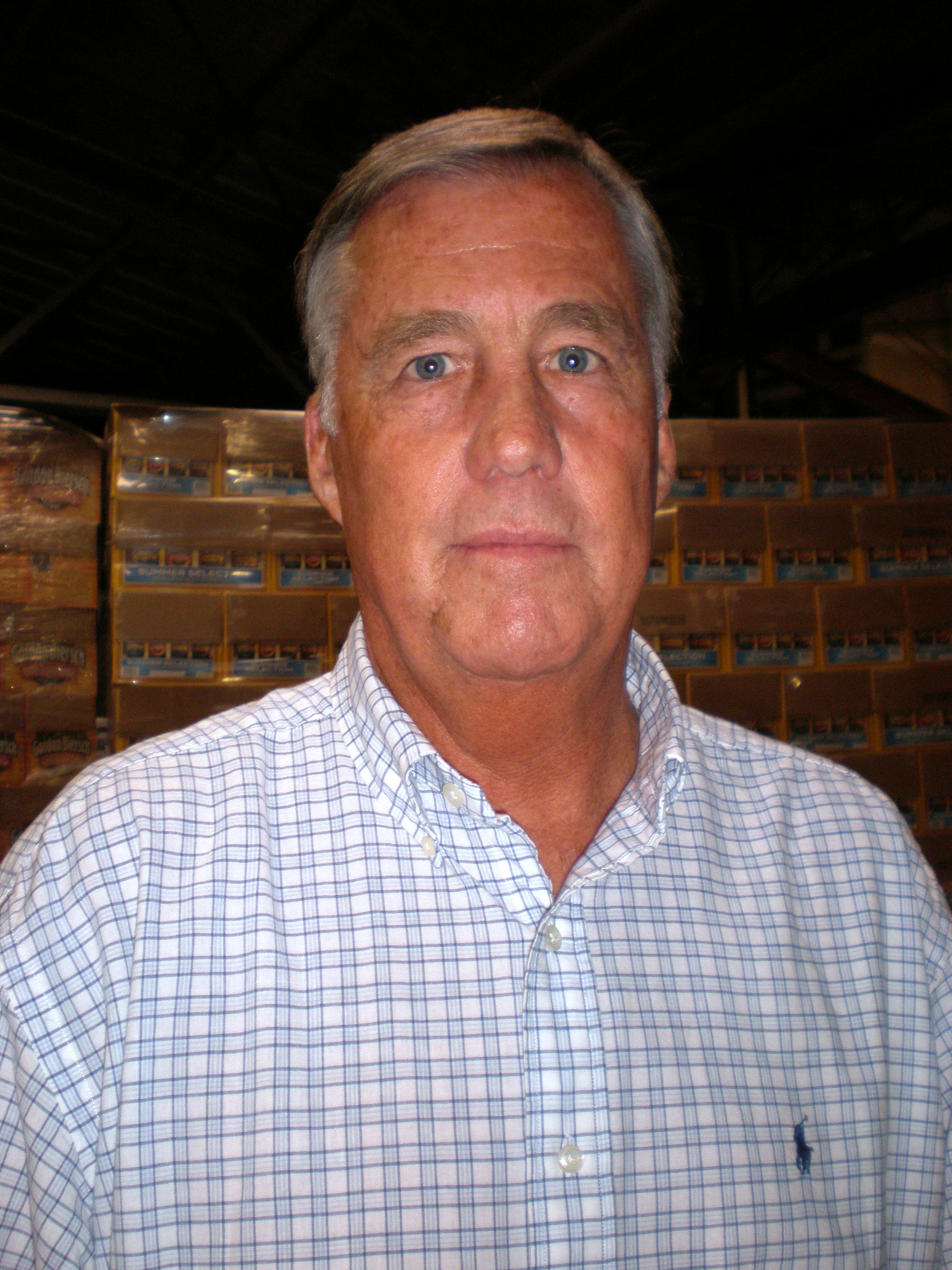
Mike Montgomery, Stanford, 2000 and 2004

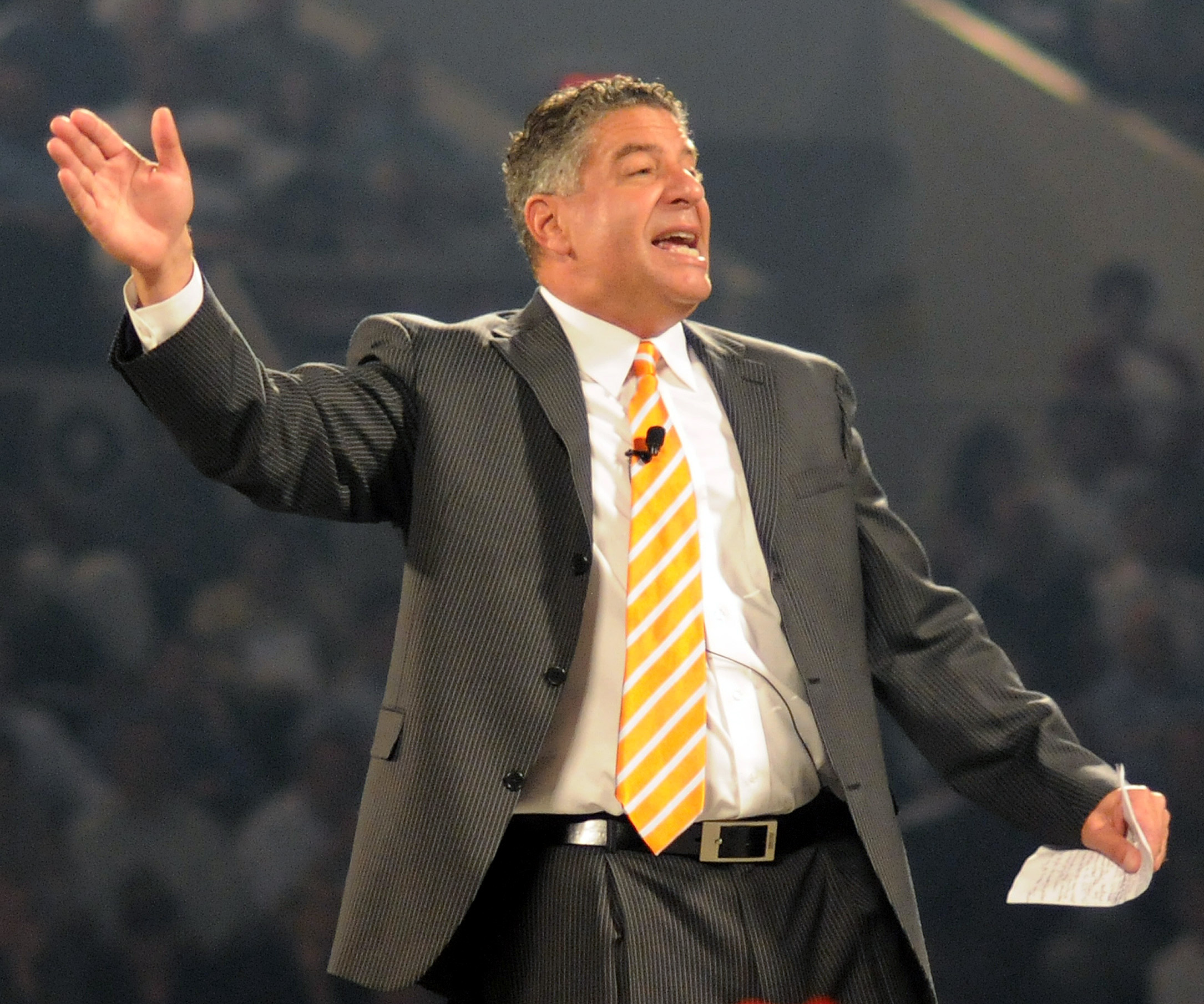
Bruce Pearl, Tennessee, 2006

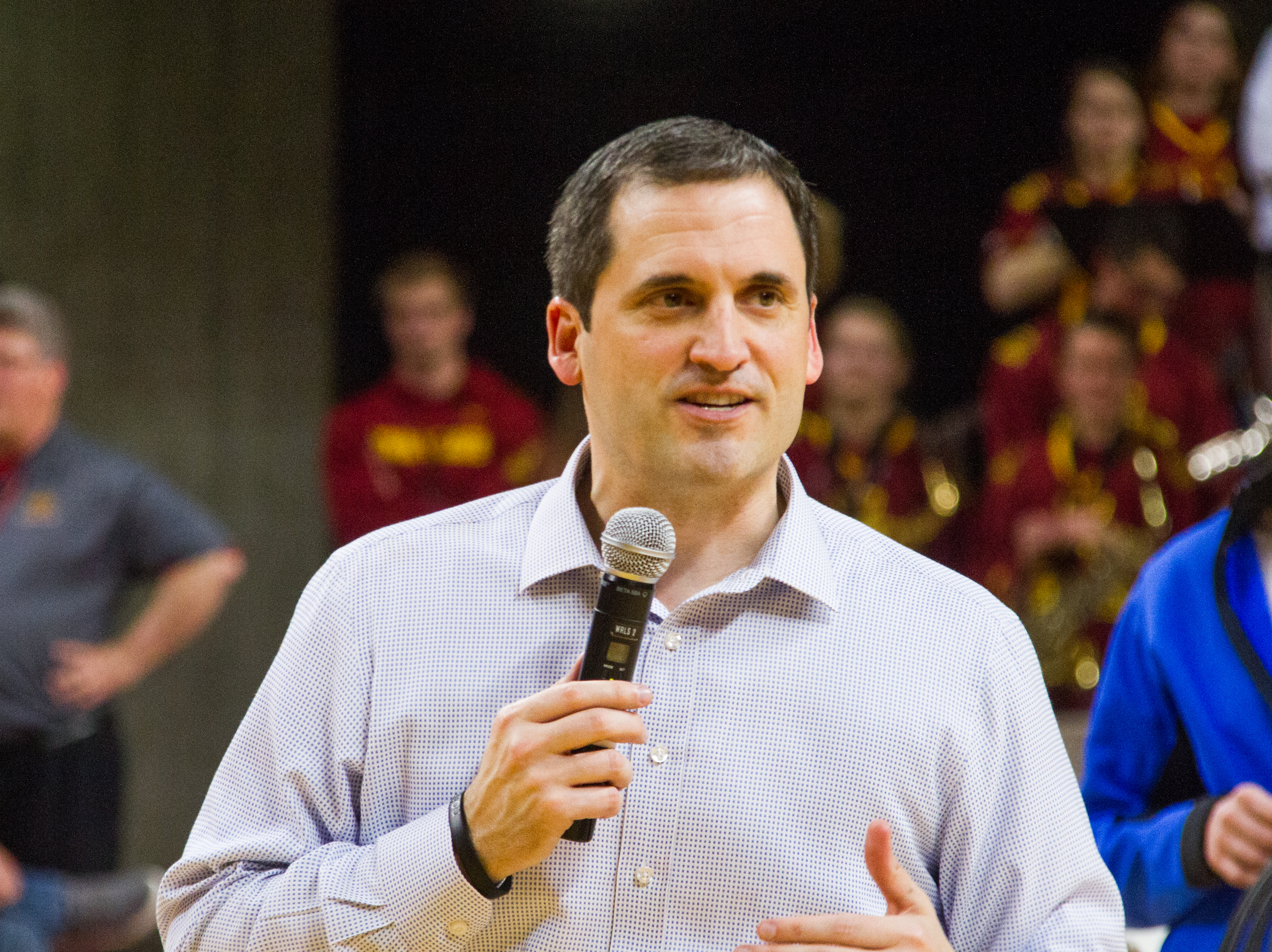
Steve Prohm, Murray State, 2012

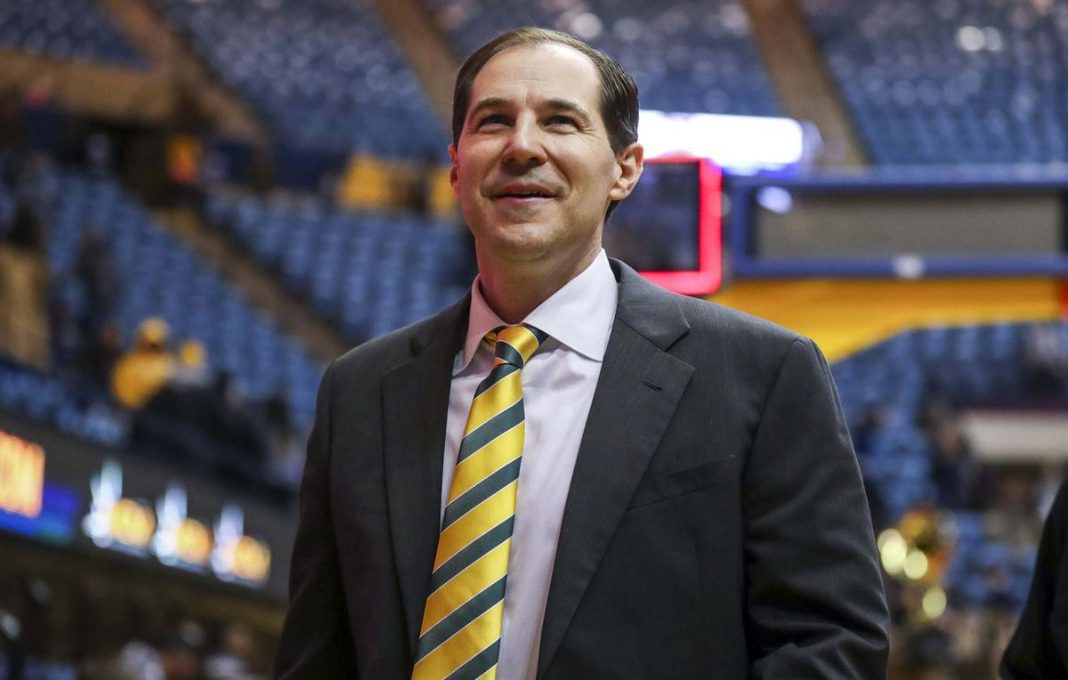
Scott Drew, Baylor, 2017

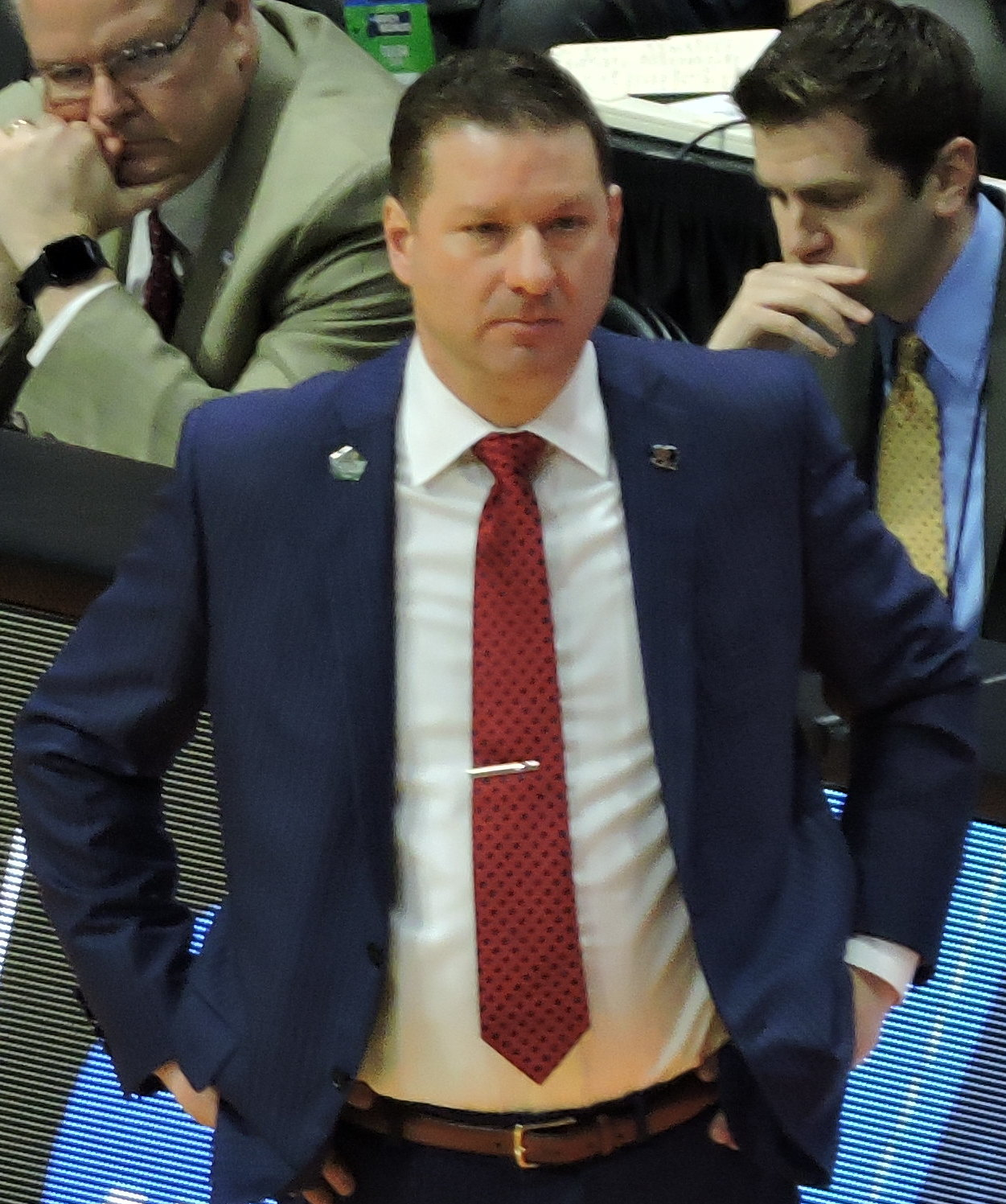
Chris Beard, Texas Tech, 2019

| Season | Coach | School | W | L | W % | Finish | Reference |
|---|---|---|---|---|---|---|---|
| 1981–82 | Gale Catlett | West Virginia | 27 | 4 | .871 | NCAA second round | |
| 1982–83 | Lou Carnesecca | St. John's | 28 | 5 | .848 | NCAA Sweet Sixteen | |
| 1983–84 | Jerry Tarkanian | UNLV | 29 | 6 | .829 | NCAA Sweet Sixteen | |
| 1984–85 | Bobby Cremins | Georgia Tech | 27 | 8 | .771 | NCAA Elite Eight | |
| 1985–86 | Mike Krzyzewski | Duke | 37 | 3 | .925 | NCAA runners-up | |
| 1986–87 | Wimp Sanderson | Alabama | 28 | 5 | .848 | NCAA Sweet Sixteen | |
| 1987–88 | Lute Olson | Arizona | 35 | 3 | .921 | NCAA Final Four | |
| 1988–89 | Bob Knight | Indiana | 27 | 8 | .771 | NCAA Sweet Sixteen | |
| 1989–90 | Jerry Tarkanian (2) | UNLV | 35 | 5 | .875 | NCAA champion^{C} | |
| 1990–91 | Rick Majerus | Utah | 30 | 4 | .882 | NCAA Sweet Sixteen | |
| 1991–92 | Steve Fisher | Michigan | 25^{[a]} | 9^{[a]} | .735^{[a]} | NCAA runners-up^{[a]} | |
| 1992–93 | Dean Smith | North Carolina | 34 | 4 | .895 | NCAA champion^{C} | |
| 1993–94 | Norm Stewart | Missouri | 28 | 4 | .875 | NCAA Elite Eight | |
| 1994–95 | Eddie Sutton | Oklahoma State | 27 | 10 | .730 | NCAA Final Four | |
| 1995–96 | John Calipari | UMass | 35^{[b]} | 2^{[b]} | .946^{[b]} | NCAA Final Four^{[b]} | |
| 1996–97 | Mike Krzyzewski (2) | Duke | 24 | 9 | .727 | NCAA second round | |
| 1997–98 | Bob Huggins | Cincinnati | 27 | 6 | .818 | NCAA second round | |
| 1998–99 | Tom Izzo | Michigan State | 33 | 5 | .868 | NCAA Final Four | |
| 1999–00 | Mike Montgomery | Stanford | 27 | 4 | .871 | NCAA second round | |
| 2000–01 | Al Skinner | Boston College | 27 | 5 | .844 | NCAA second round | |
| 2001–02 | Bob Knight (2) | Texas Tech | 23 | 9 | .719 | NCAA first round | |
| 2002–03 | Tubby Smith | Kentucky | 32 | 4 | .889 | NCAA Elite Eight | |
| 2003–04 | Mike Montgomery (2) | Stanford | 30 | 2 | .938 | NCAA second round | |
| 2004–05 | Bruce Weber | Illinois | 37 | 2 | .949 | NCAA runners-up | |
| 2005–06 | Bruce Pearl | Tennessee | 22 | 8 | .733 | NCAA second round | |
| 2006–07 | Tony Bennett | Washington State | 26 | 8 | .765 | NCAA second round | |
| 2007–08 | Keno Davis | Drake | 28 | 5 | .848 | NCAA first round | |
| 2008–09 | Leonard Hamilton | Florida State | 25 | 10 | .714 | NCAA first round | |
| 2009–10 | Jim Boeheim | Syracuse | 30 | 5 | .857 | NCAA Sweet Sixteen | |
| 2010–11 | Mike Brey | Notre Dame | 27 | 7 | .794 | NCAA round of 32^{[c]} | |
| 2011–12 | Steve Prohm | Murray State | 31 | 2 | .939 | NCAA round of 32 | |
| 2012–13 | Mark Few | Gonzaga | 32 | 3 | .914 | NCAA round of 32 | |
| 2013–14 | Gregg Marshall | Wichita State | 35 | 1 | .972 | NCAA round of 32 | |
| 2014–15 | John Calipari (2) | Kentucky | 38 | 1 | .974 | NCAA Final Four | |
| 2015–16 | Chris Mack | Xavier | 28 | 6 | .824 | NCAA round of 32 | |
| 2016–17 | Scott Drew | Baylor | 27 | 8 | .771 | NCAA Sweet Sixteen | |
| 2017–18 | Chris Mack (2) | Xavier | 29 | 6 | .829 | NCAA round of 32 | |
| 2018–19 | Chris Beard | Texas Tech | 31 | 7 | .816 | NCAA runners-up | |
| 2019–20 | Anthony Grant | Dayton | 29 | 2 | .935 | N/A^{[d]} | |
| 2020–21 | Mark Few (2) | Gonzaga | 31 | 1 | .969 | NCAA runners-up | |

- ^{a} Michigan vacated its two 1992 Final Four games and its status as tournament runner-up due to the Ed Martin scandal in which Martin, a booster, paid several players to launder money from an illegal gambling operation.
- ^{b} On May 8, 1997, the NCAA Executive Committee voted to negate the Minutemen's 1996 NCAA tournament record, for Marcus Camby's acceptance of agents' improper gifts. The 35–2 record was reduced to 31–1, and the UMass slot in the Final Four is officially denoted as vacated.
- ^{c} The NCAA men's tournament expanded to 68 teams starting in 2011, with the last four teams earning bids into the tournament set in competition with one another via "First Four" play-in games. The 'second round' then became more commonly referred to as 'round of 32' for specificity.
- ^{d} The COVID-19 pandemic caused the 2019–20 season to be canceled prior to any national postseason tournaments occurring.

== See also ==
- Basketball Times Player of the Year
