= Basketball Times Player of the Year =

College basketball player award

Basketball Times National Player of the Year
- Awarded for: the best men's college basketball player in NCAA Division I competition
- Country: United States
- Presented by: Basketball Times

History
- First award: 1982
- Final award: 2021

The Basketball Times National Player of the Year Award was established in 1982 to recognize the best men's college basketball player by Basketball Times magazine. It was considered a major national player of the year honor by the National Collegiate Athletic Association (NCAA), and the winners are still published in the annually updated NCAA Division I men's basketball media guides. The print magazine ceased operations in 2021 while a spinoff, online-only continuation CollegeBasketballTimes.com carried on. Although the website has exclusive rights to Basketball Times' entire print catalog, the website's awards and status are not recognized by the NCAA, effectively ending the selector's influence with the print magazine's 2021 folding.

Only two players won the honor multiple times, and they coincidentally book-ended the award's history: Ralph Sampson of Virginia won the first two in 1982 and 1983, while Luka Garza of Iowa won the final two Basketball Times player of the year awards in 2020 and 2021. There was one tie in the award's history when Duke's JJ Redick and Gonzaga's Adam Morrison shared it in 2006.

== Key ==
†	Co-Players of the Year
Player (X)	Denotes the number of times the player has been awarded the Basketball Times Player of the Year Award at that point

== Winners ==
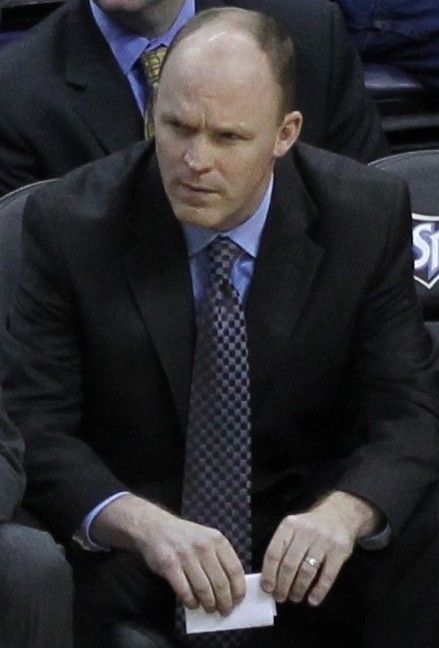
Scott Skiles, Michigan State, 1986

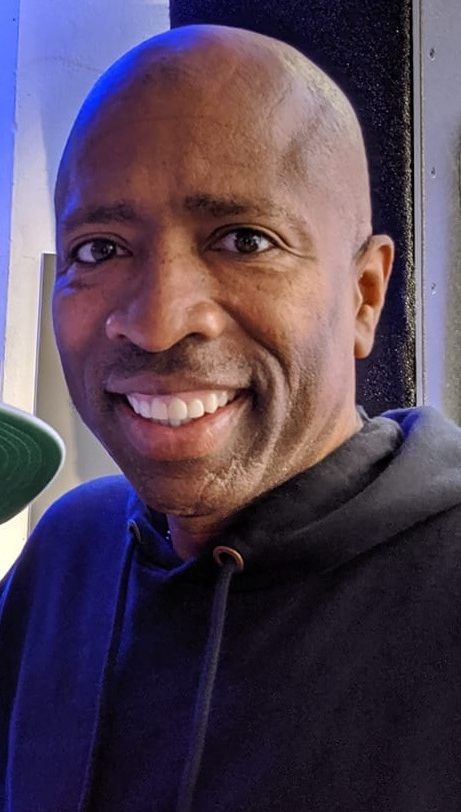
Kenny Smith, North Carolina, 1987

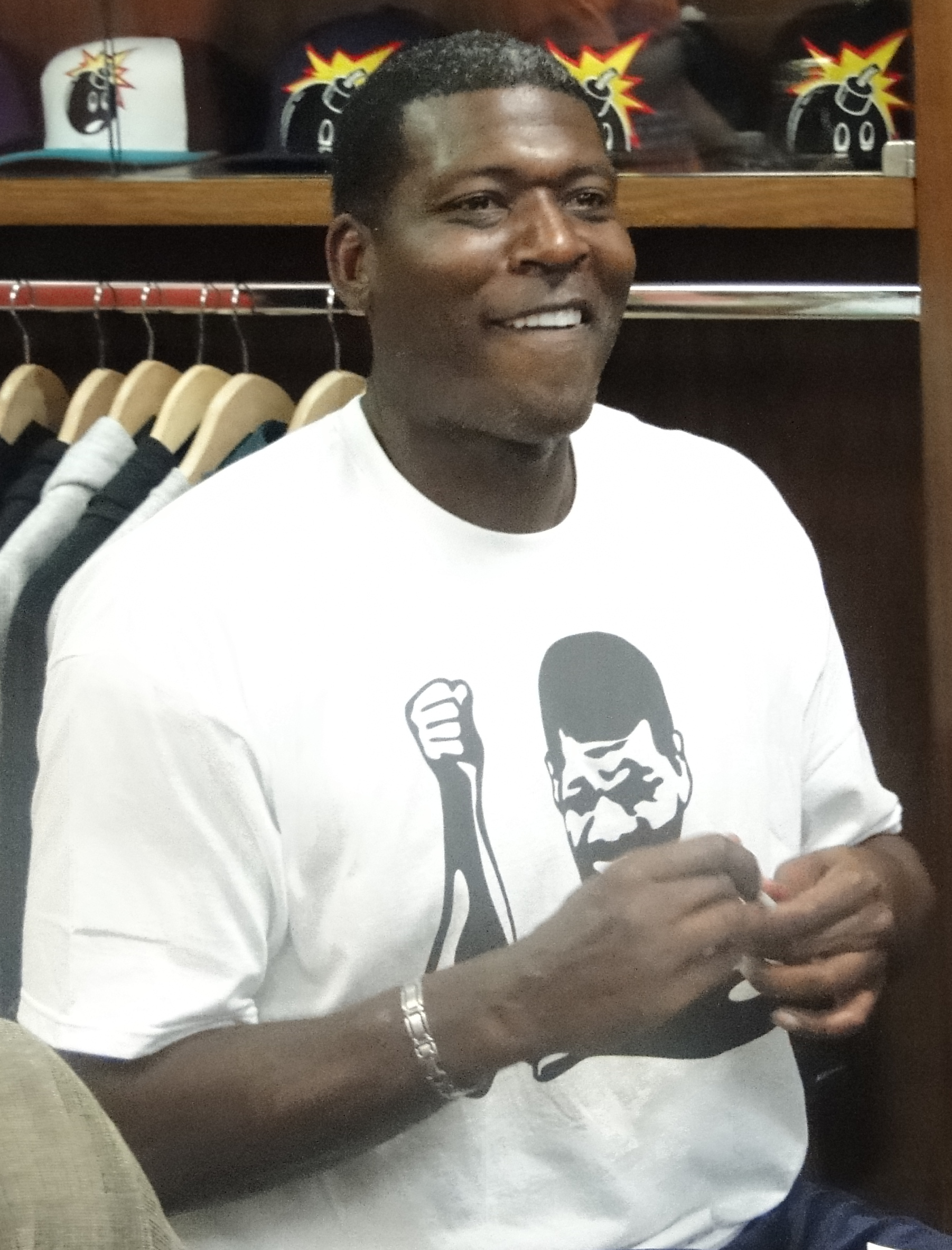
Larry Johnson, UNLV, 1991

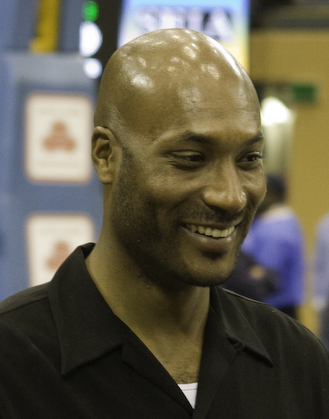
Ed O'Bannon, UCLA, 1995

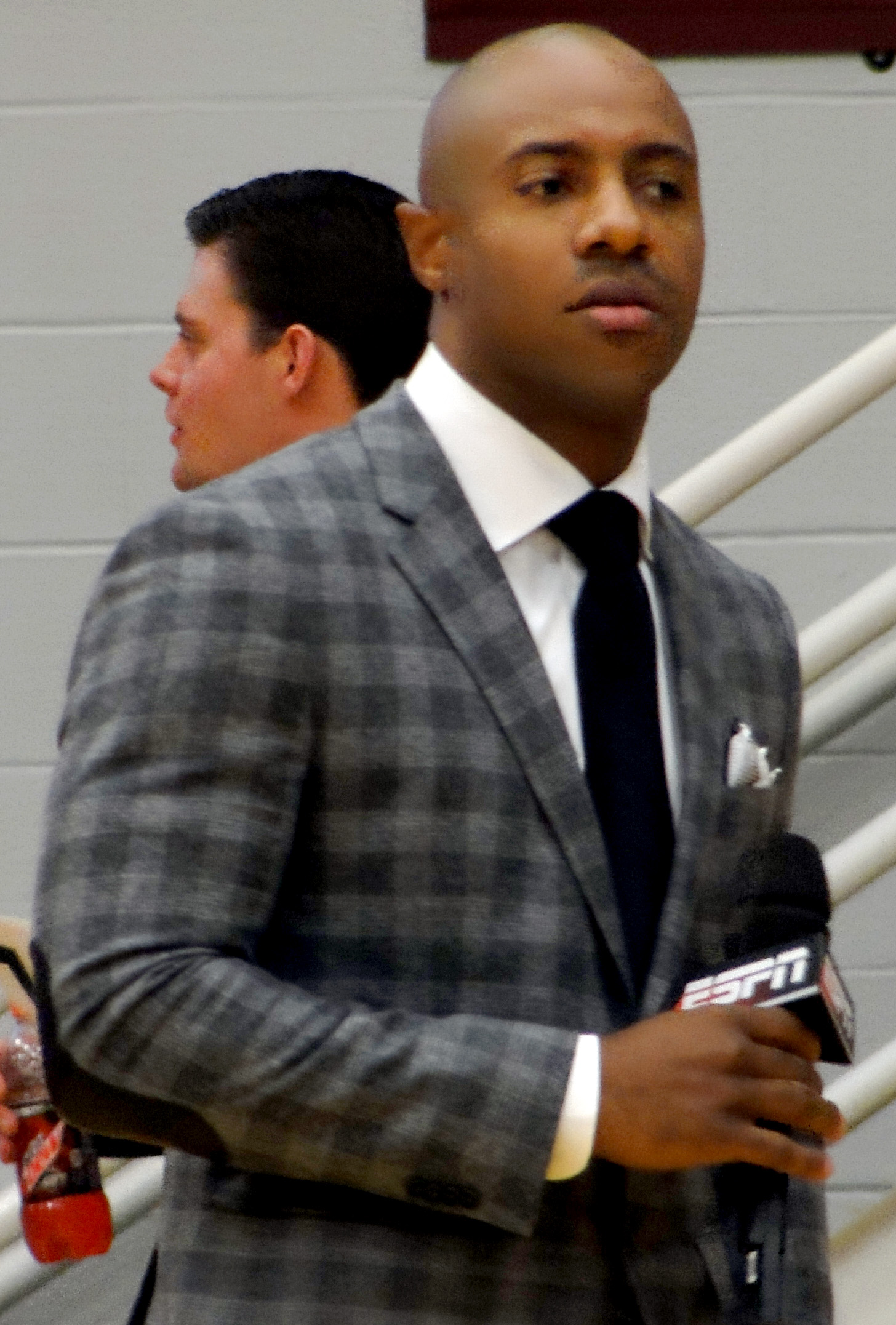
Jason Williams, Duke, 2002

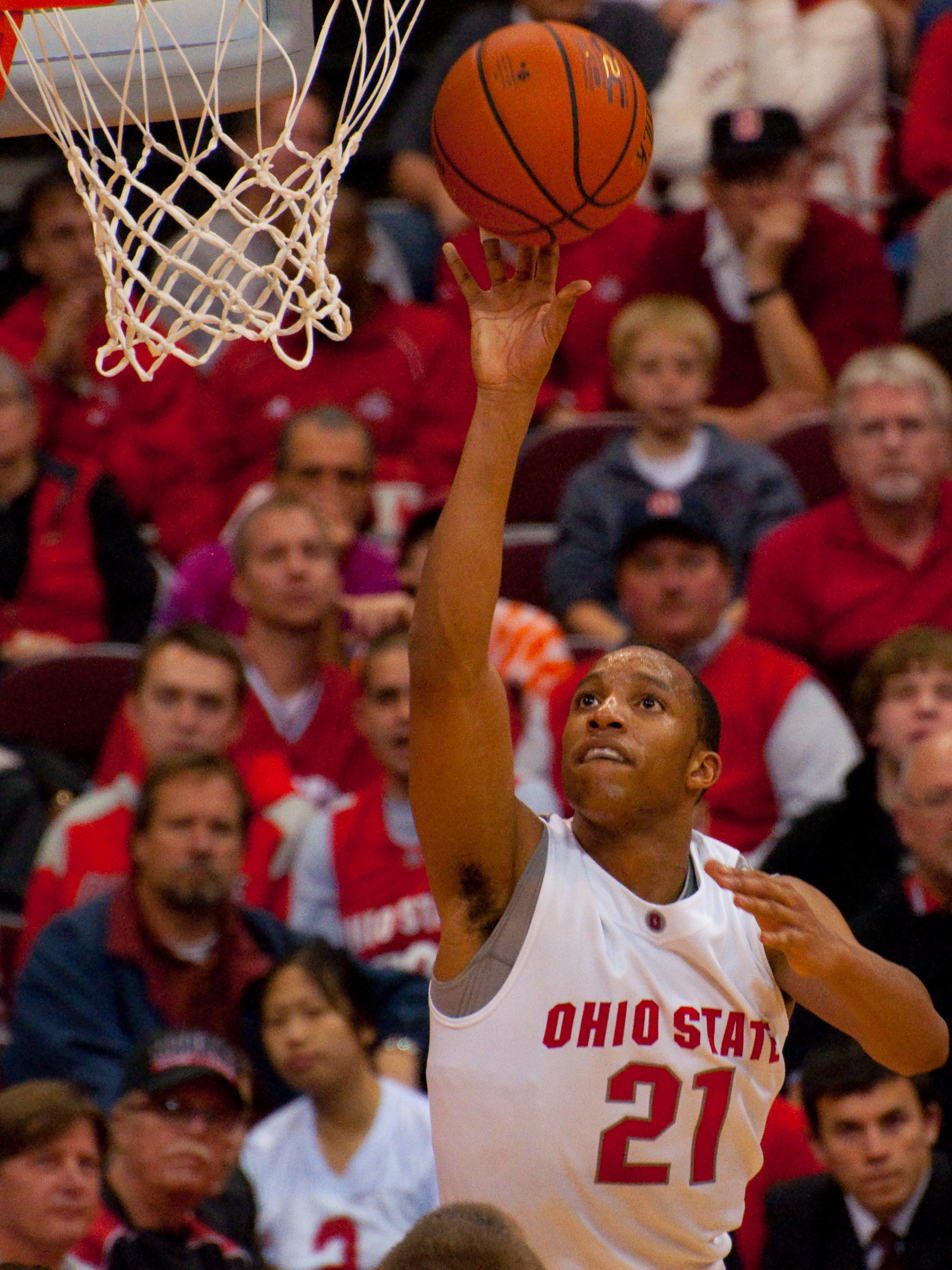
Evan Turner, Ohio State, 2010

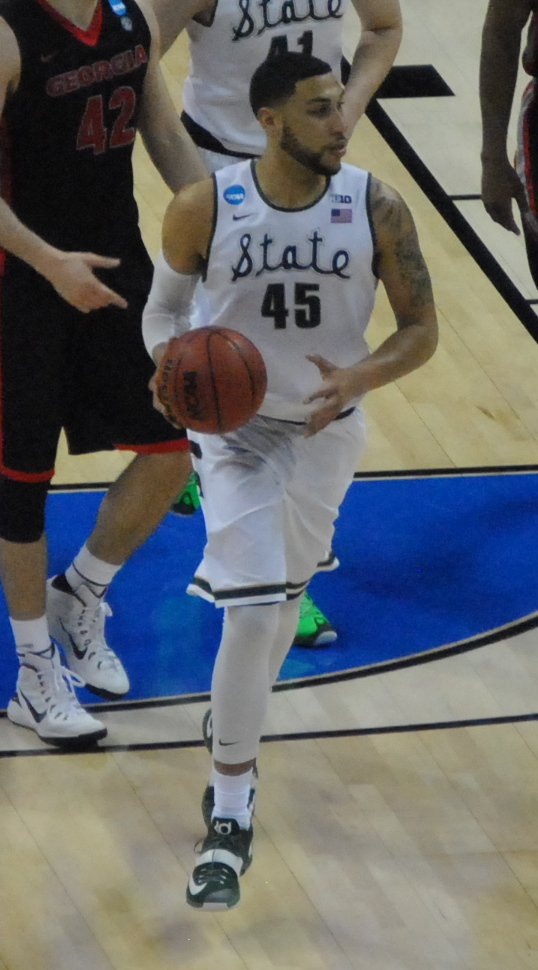
Denzel Valentine, Michigan State, 2016

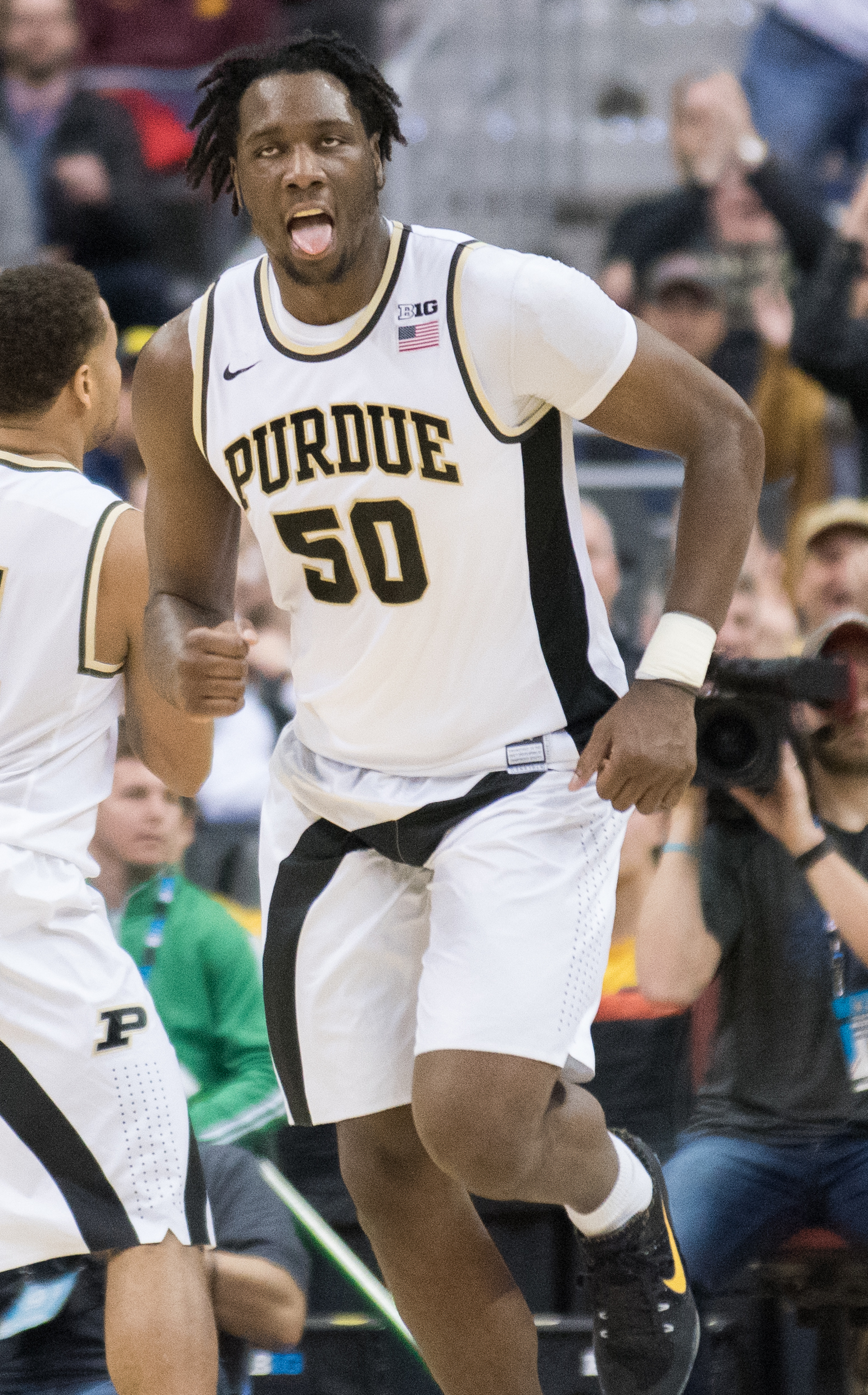
Caleb Swanigan, Purdue, 2017

Season	Player	School	Position	Class	Reference
1981–82	Ralph Sampson	Virginia	C	Junior	
1982–83	Ralph Sampson (2)	Virginia	C	Senior	
1983–84	Akeem Olajuwon^{[a]}	Houston	C	Junior	
1984–85	Patrick Ewing	Georgetown	C	Senior	
1985–86	Scott Skiles	Michigan State	PG	Senior	
1986–87	Kenny Smith	North Carolina	PG	Senior	
1987–88	Hersey Hawkins	Bradley	SG	Senior	
1988–89	Sean Elliott	Arizona	SF	Senior	
1989–90	Derrick Coleman	Syracuse	PF / C	Senior	
1990–91	Larry Johnson	UNLV	PF	Senior	
1991–92	Christian Laettner	Duke	PF / C	Senior	
1992–93	Jamal Mashburn	Kentucky	SF	Junior	
1993–94	Glenn Robinson	Purdue	SF	Junior	
1994–95	Ed O'Bannon	UCLA	PF	Senior	
1995–96	Marcus Camby	UMass	C	Junior	
1996–97	Tim Duncan	Wake Forest	C	Senior	
1997–98	Antawn Jamison	North Carolina	SF	Junior	
1998–99	Jason Terry	Arizona	SG / PG	Senior	
1999–00	Kenyon Martin	Cincinnati	PF	Senior	
2000–01	Shane Battier	Duke	SF / SG	Senior	
2001–02	Jason Williams	Duke	PG	Junior	
2002–03	David West	Xavier	PF	Senior	
2003–04	Jameer Nelson	Saint Joseph's	PG	Senior	
2004–05	Andrew Bogut	Utah	C	Sophomore	
2005–06^{†}	Adam Morrison	Gonzaga	SF	Junior	
2005–06^{†}	JJ Redick	Duke	SG	Senior	
2006–07	Kevin Durant	Texas	SF	Freshman	
2007–08	Tyler Hansbrough	North Carolina	PF	Junior	
2008–09	Blake Griffin	Oklahoma	PF	Sophomore	
2009–10	Evan Turner	Ohio State	SG	Junior	
2010–11	Jimmer Fredette	BYU	SG	Senior	
2011–12	Anthony Davis	Kentucky	C	Freshman	
2012–13	Otto Porter Jr.	Georgetown	SF / PF	Sophomore	
2013–14	Doug McDermott	Creighton	SF	Senior	
2014–15	Frank Kaminsky	Wisconsin	PF	Senior	
2015–16	Denzel Valentine	Michigan State	SG	Senior	
2016–17	Caleb Swanigan	Purdue	PF / C	Sophomore	
2017–18	Marvin Bagley III	Duke	PF	Freshman	
2018–19	Zion Williamson	Duke	PF	Freshman	
2019–20	Luka Garza	Iowa	C	Junior	
2020–21	Luka Garza (2)	Iowa	C	Senior	

- ^{a} Olajuwon later changed his first name's spelling from Akeem to Hakeem to use the original Arabic spelling.

== See also ==
- Basketball Times Coach of the Year
