= Basketball Times =

- Managing Editor: John Akers
- Categories: College basketball
- Frequency: Monthly
- Publisher: Akers Ink LLC
- First issue: October 1978; 48 years ago
- Final issue: May 2021; 5 years ago
- Country: USA
- Based in: Matthews, North Carolina
- Language: English
- Website: www.basketballtimes.com
- ISSN: 0744-2866

Basketball Times was an American basketball magazine that was in circulation from 1978 to 2021, and was published by Akers Ink LLC. Basketball Times published monthly and mainly focused on college basketball. The headquarters was in Matthews, North Carolina. The magazine ceased publication with the May 2021 issue.

== History ==
Basketball Times was launched in October 1978, created by Jay Myers and financed by Edward Bomze. The magazine began as a weekly, during basketball season, that catered to the NBA as much as it did the college game. Basketball Times lasted about two years under Myers and Bomze. Larry Donald purchased Basketball Times in 1980.

While running Basketball Times, Donald was cited 19 times by the United States Basketball Writers Association in its annual writing contest. In 1998, he was presented the Curt Gowdy Award by the Basketball Hall of Fame for service to the sport over his career.

After Donald died of an apparent heart attack in November 2000, his wife Nanci continued to run Basketball Times. John Akers, the managing editor of BT from 2001–11, became publisher of Basketball Times in September 2011. Akers has won 22 USBWA writing awards.

== Magazine features ==
=== Under the Radar ===
Done annually for the past five seasons, every projected Division I starter is run through an efficiency rating known as the "Larry Bird formula" - a plus/minus system of positive and negative statistics - and takes note of those players who jump out unexpectedly. They then run those players through another filter - testing their efficiency again, but against better teams - before making final decisions.

== Writers and editors ==
Editors and contributors for Basketball Times have included:

- Larry Donald (founder)
- John Akers (publisher)
- Dick “Hoops” Weiss
- Bob Ryan
- Rick Bozich
- Wendy Parker
- Dick Vitale
- Mike Sheridan
- Dan Wetzel
- J.R. VanHoose
