= List of U.S. men's college basketball national coach of the year awards =

This article lists U.S. men's college basketball national coach of the year awards. Several organizations sponsor an award for the top men's college basketball coach in the United States. Through 2026, there have been only 18 seasons in which a single coach has swept all of the major national coach of the year awards since 1959. Of those 18, only six have occurred since 2000, making sweeps a very uncommon result. The most recent coach to achieve this was Dayton's Anthony Grant in 2020.

The coach with the most all-time seasons earning at least one national coaching award is UCLA's John Wooden, with seven. There are eight coaches tied for second-most with four seasons each, the most recent of whom is Kelvin Sampson, with his most recent national coaching award season coming in 2024–25. The 1999–2000 season is notable for being the only one in which five different head coaches won at least one national coaching award (Larry Eustachy, Bob Huggins, Gene Keady, Mike Montgomery, and Bill Self).

== Sponsoring organizations ==
Active awards
Award name	Sponsoring organization	First awarded
Henry Iba Award	U.S. Basketball Writers Association	1959
NABC Coach of the Year	National Association of Basketball Coaches	1959
The Sporting News Coach of the Year	The Sporting News	1964
Associated Press Coach of the Year	Associated Press	1967
Naismith Coach of the Year	Atlanta Tipoff Club	1987

Discontinued awards
Award name	Sponsoring organization	Years awarded
UPI Coach of the Year	United Press International	1952–1996
CBS/Chevrolet Coach of the Year	CBS Sports / Chevrolet	1981–2009
Basketball Times Coach of the Year	Basketball Times	1982–2021
Adolph Rupp Cup	Commonwealth Athletic Club of Kentucky	2004–2015

== Key ==
†	Shared (non-consensus) national coaches of the year
Coach (X)	Denotes the number of years the coach has been awarded a national coach of the year award at that point
✓	Coach won award
✗	Coach did not win award
T	Tied for award

== List of awardees ==
The below list includes winners from just the active national coach of the year award sponsoring organizations.

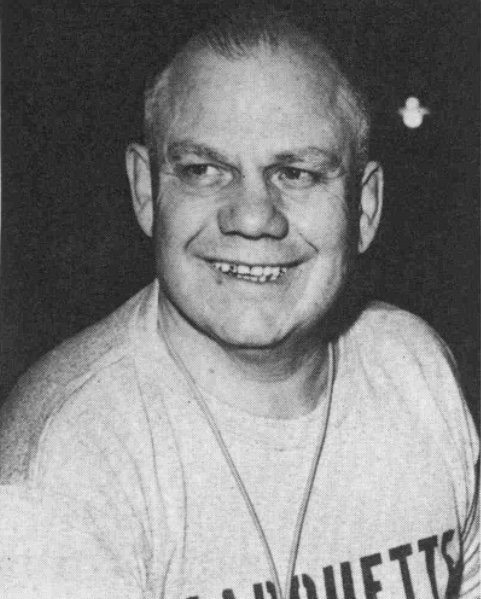
Eddie Hickey, 1959

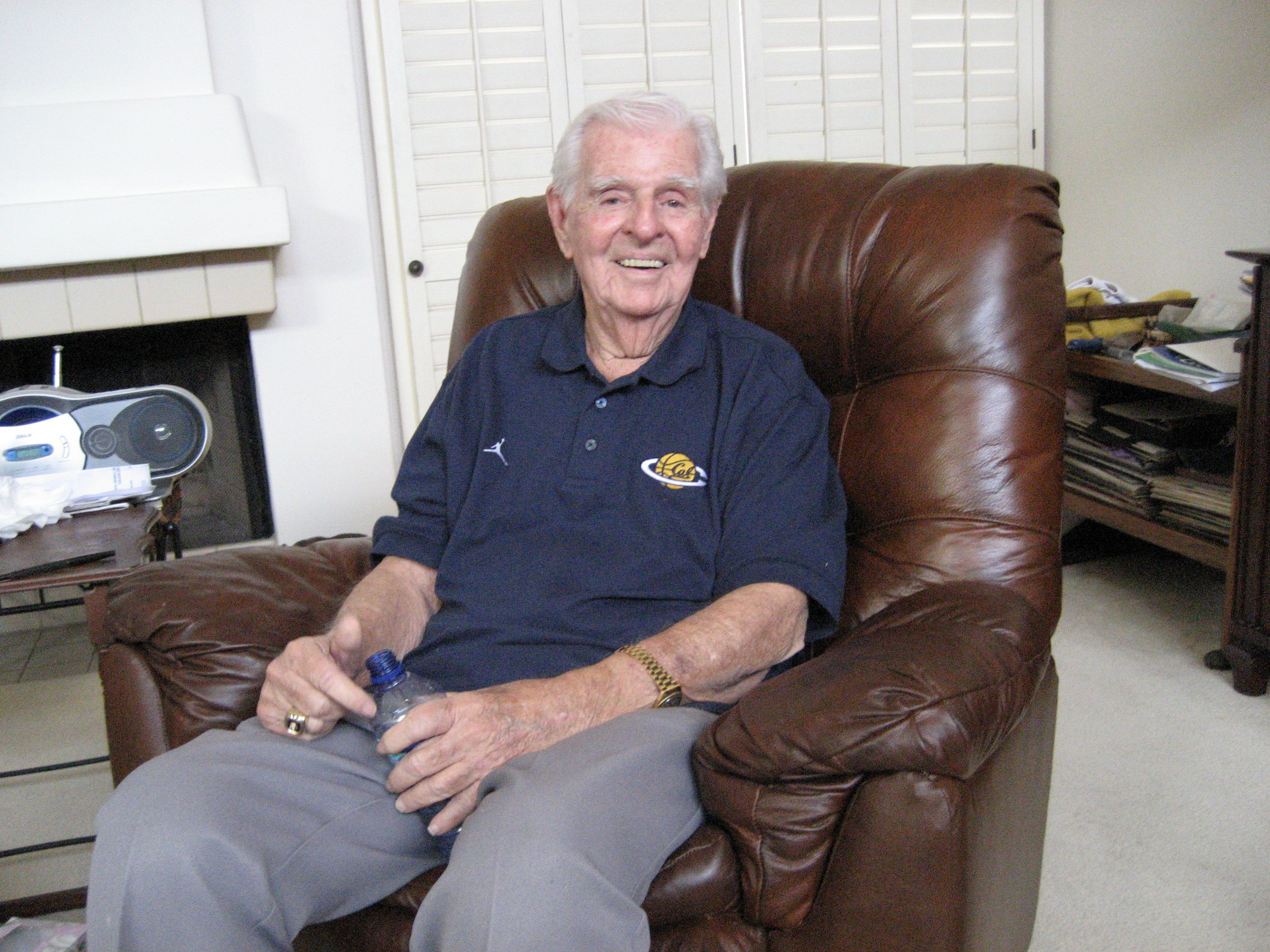
Pete Newell, 1960

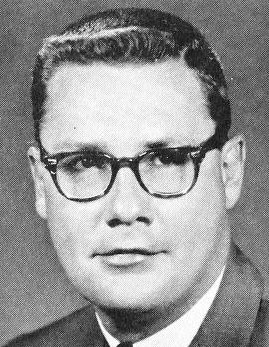
Fred Taylor, 1961 and 1962

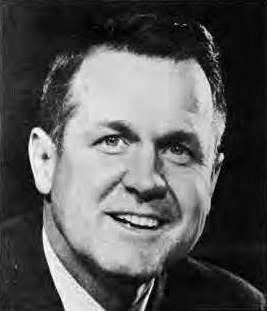
Ed Jucker, 1963

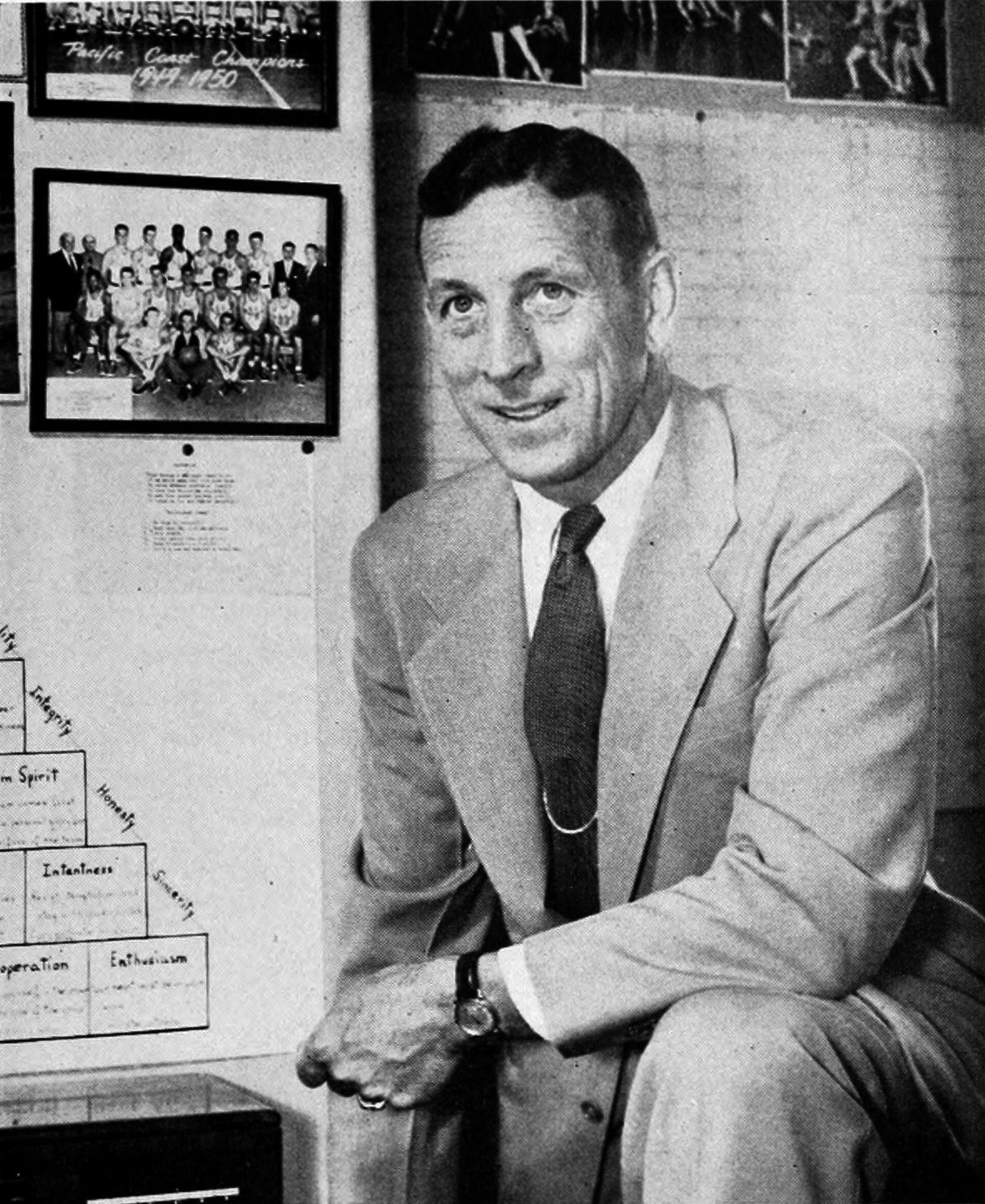
John Wooden, 7× winner

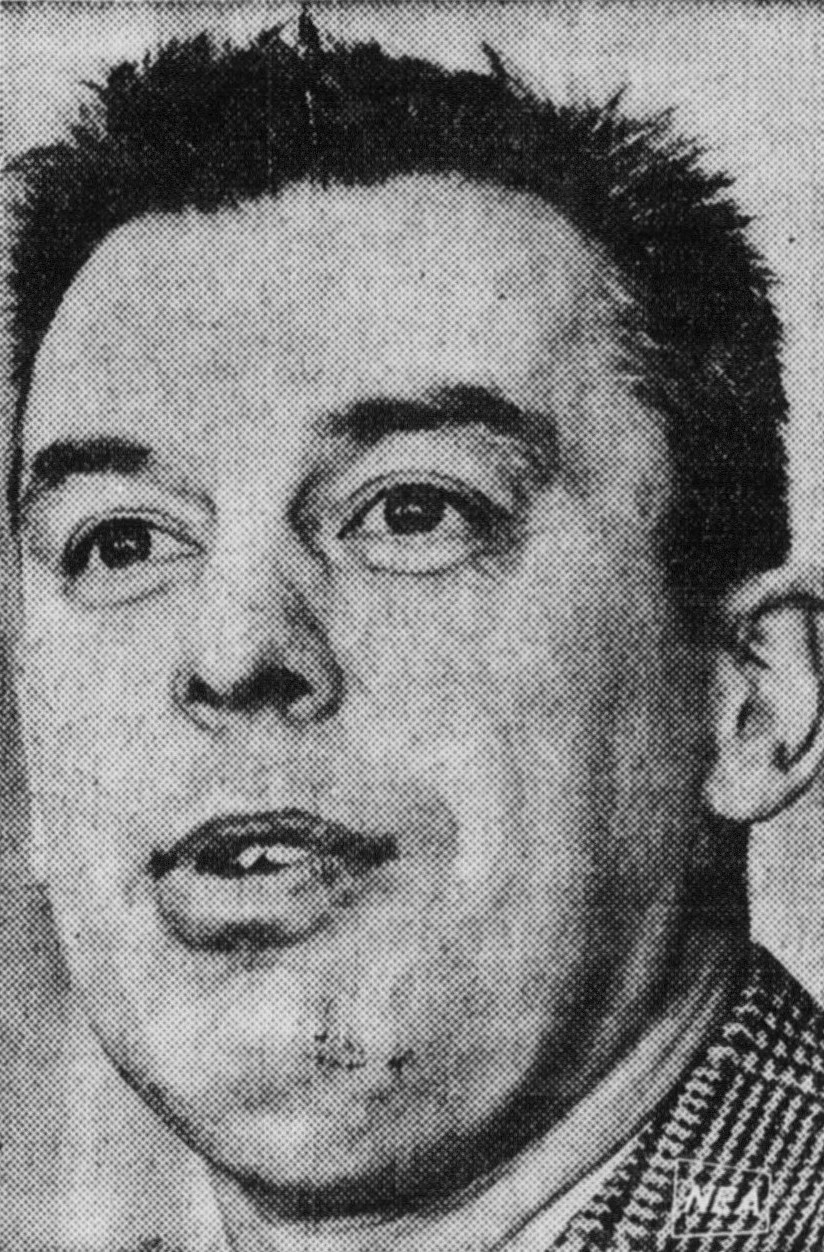
Butch van Breda Kolff, 1965

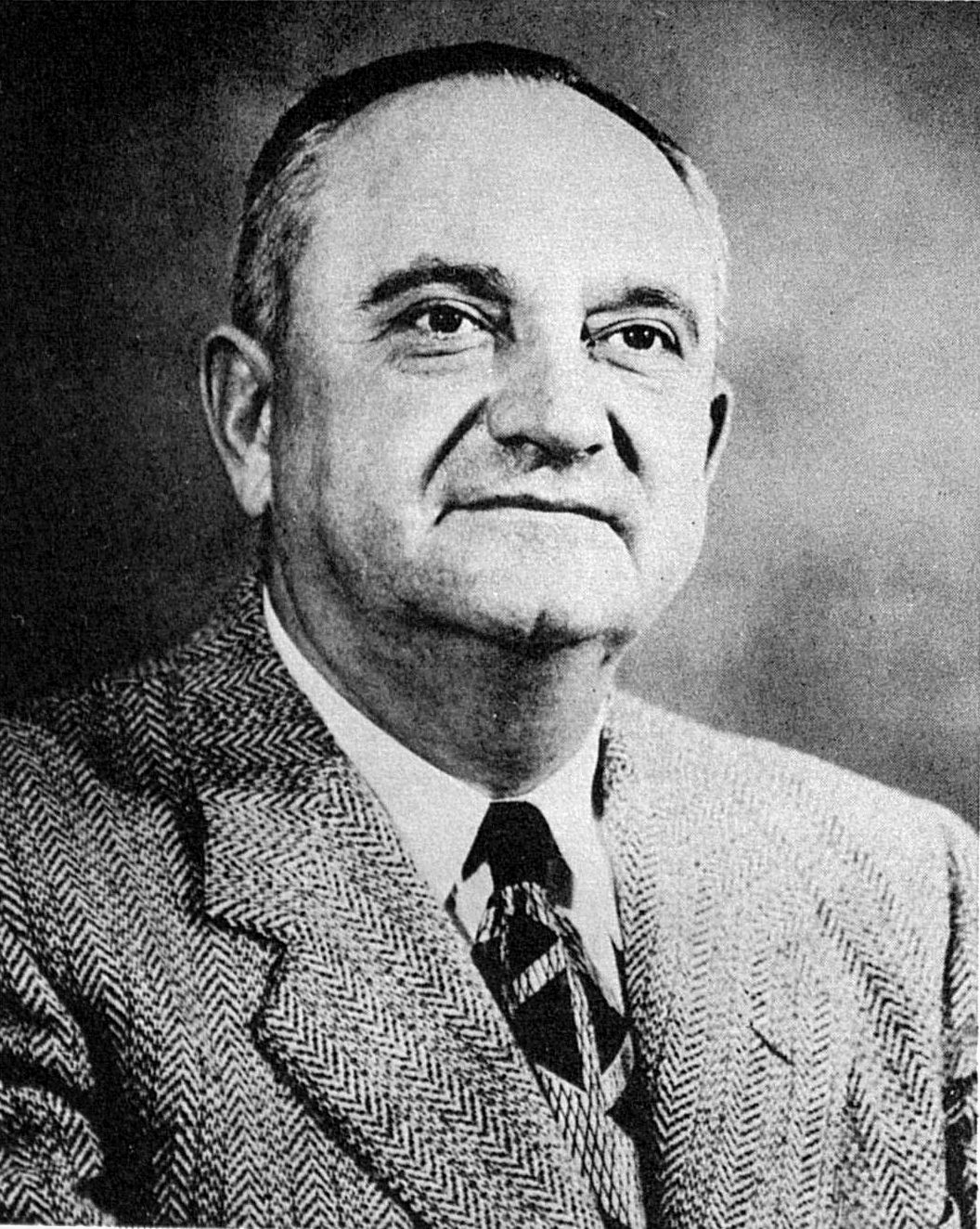
Adolph Rupp, 1966 and 1970

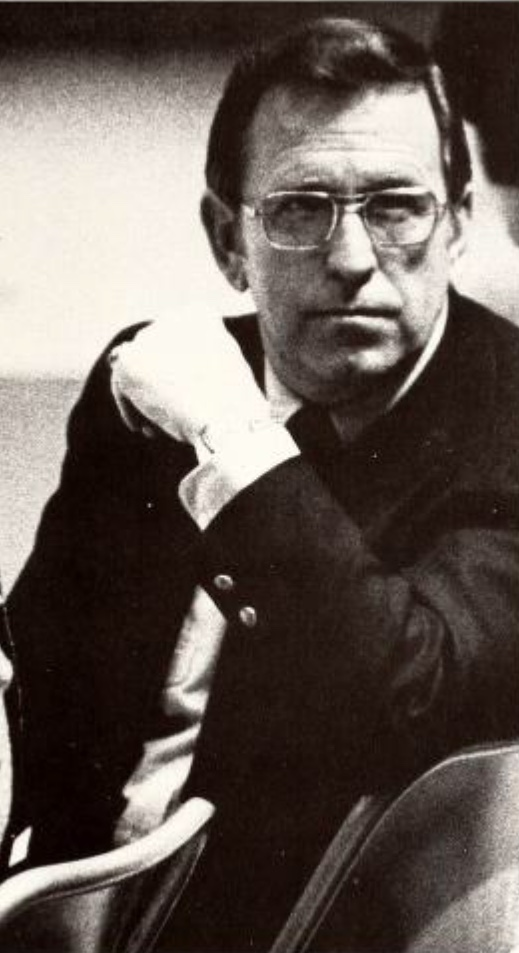
Jack Hartman, 1967 and 1981

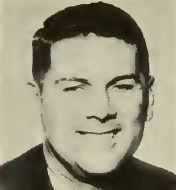
Tom Young, 1976

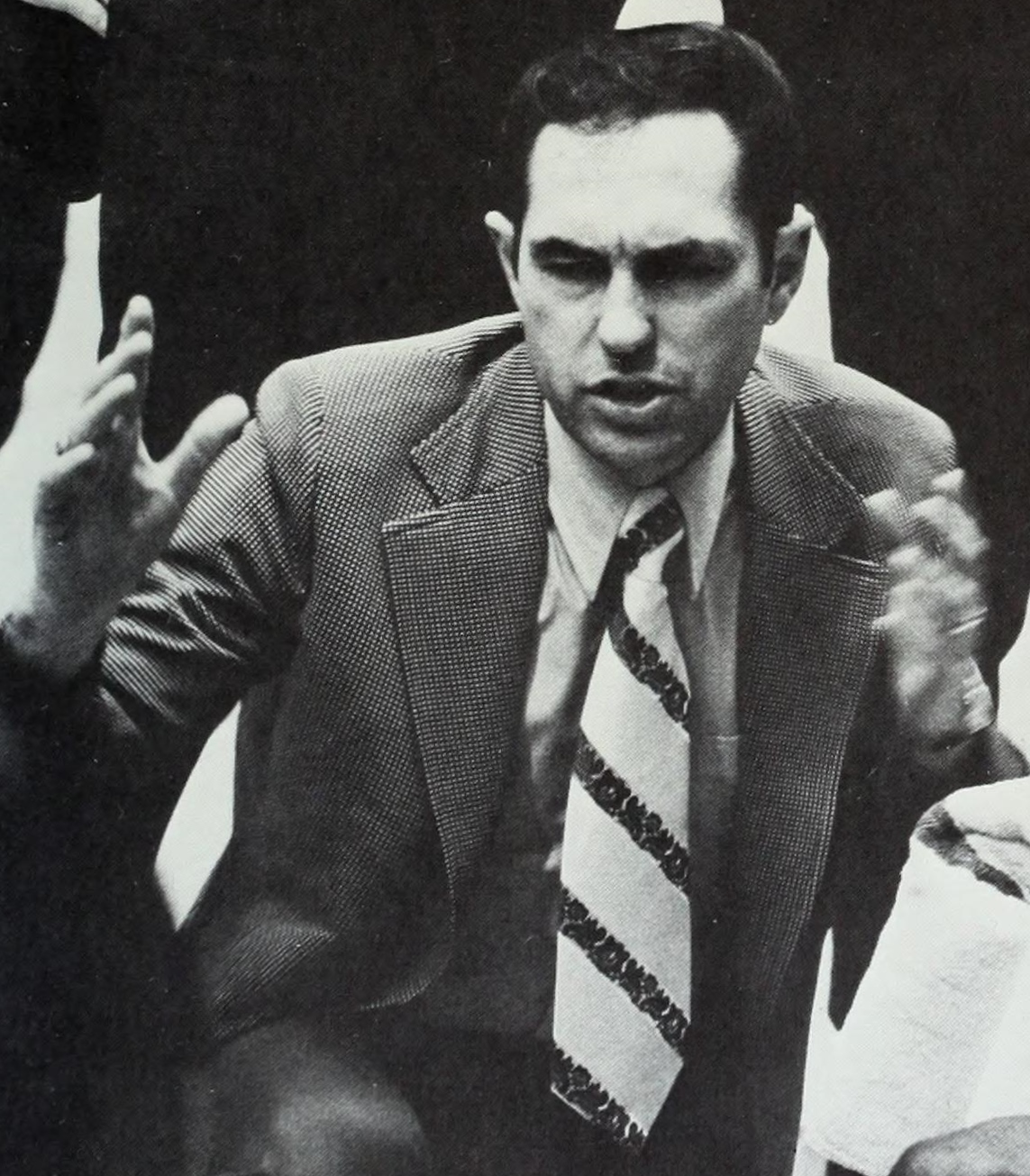
Eddie Sutton, 3× winner

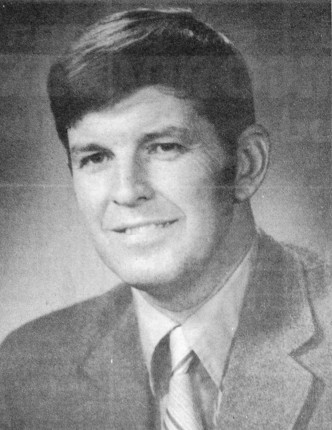
Bill Foster, 1978

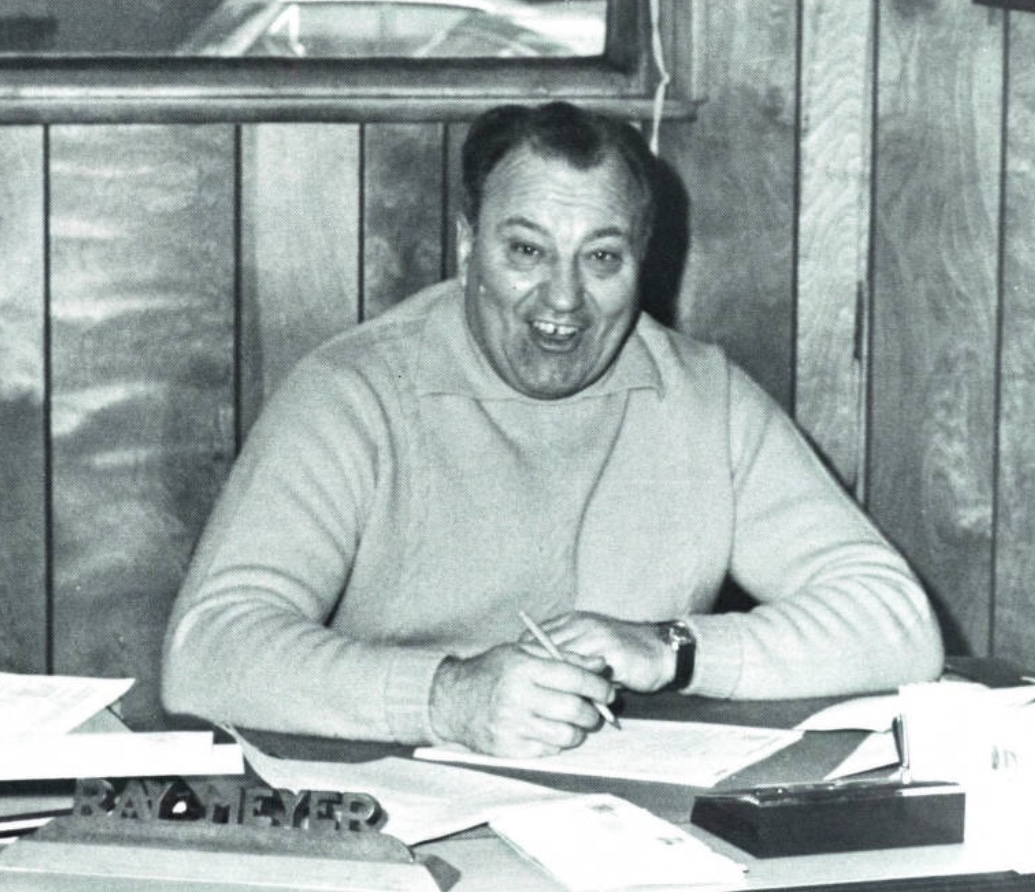
Ray Meyer, 4× winner

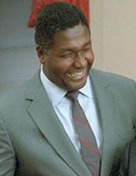
John Thompson, 3× winner

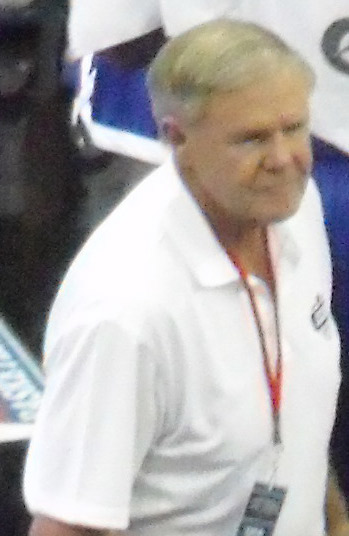
Denny Crum, 1983 and 1986

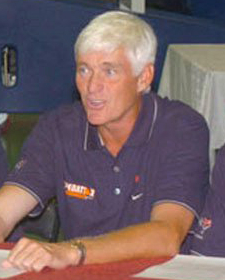
Bobby Cremins, 1990

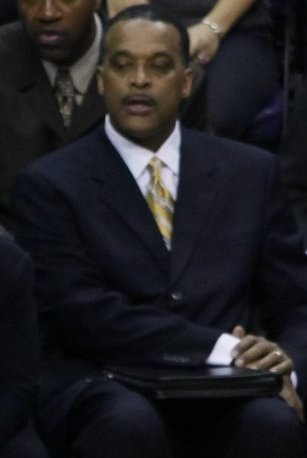
Randy Ayers, 1991

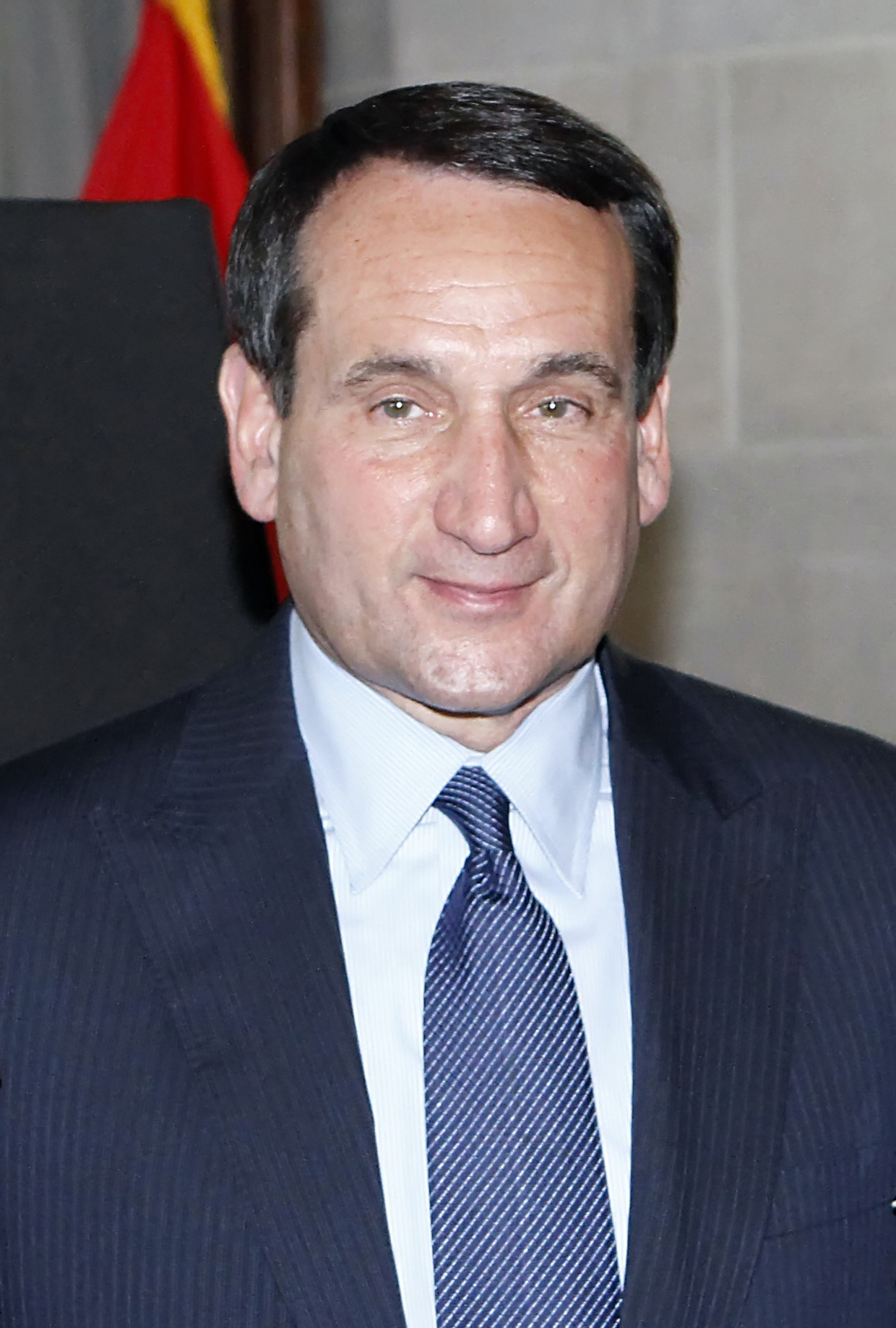
Mike Krzyzewski, 4× winner

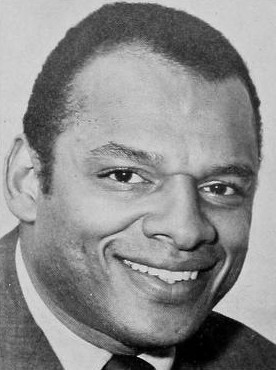
George Raveling, 1992

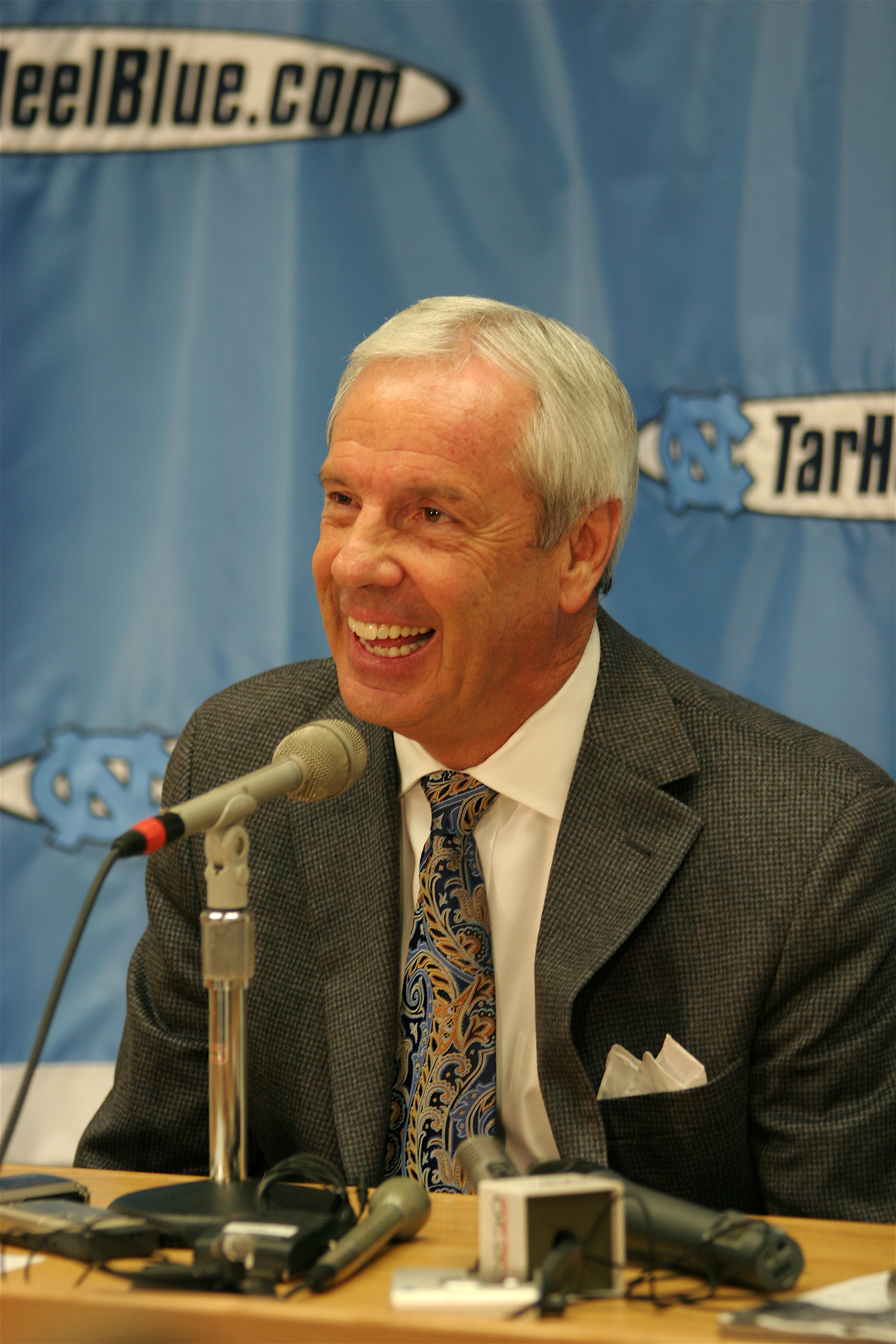
Roy Williams, 4× winner

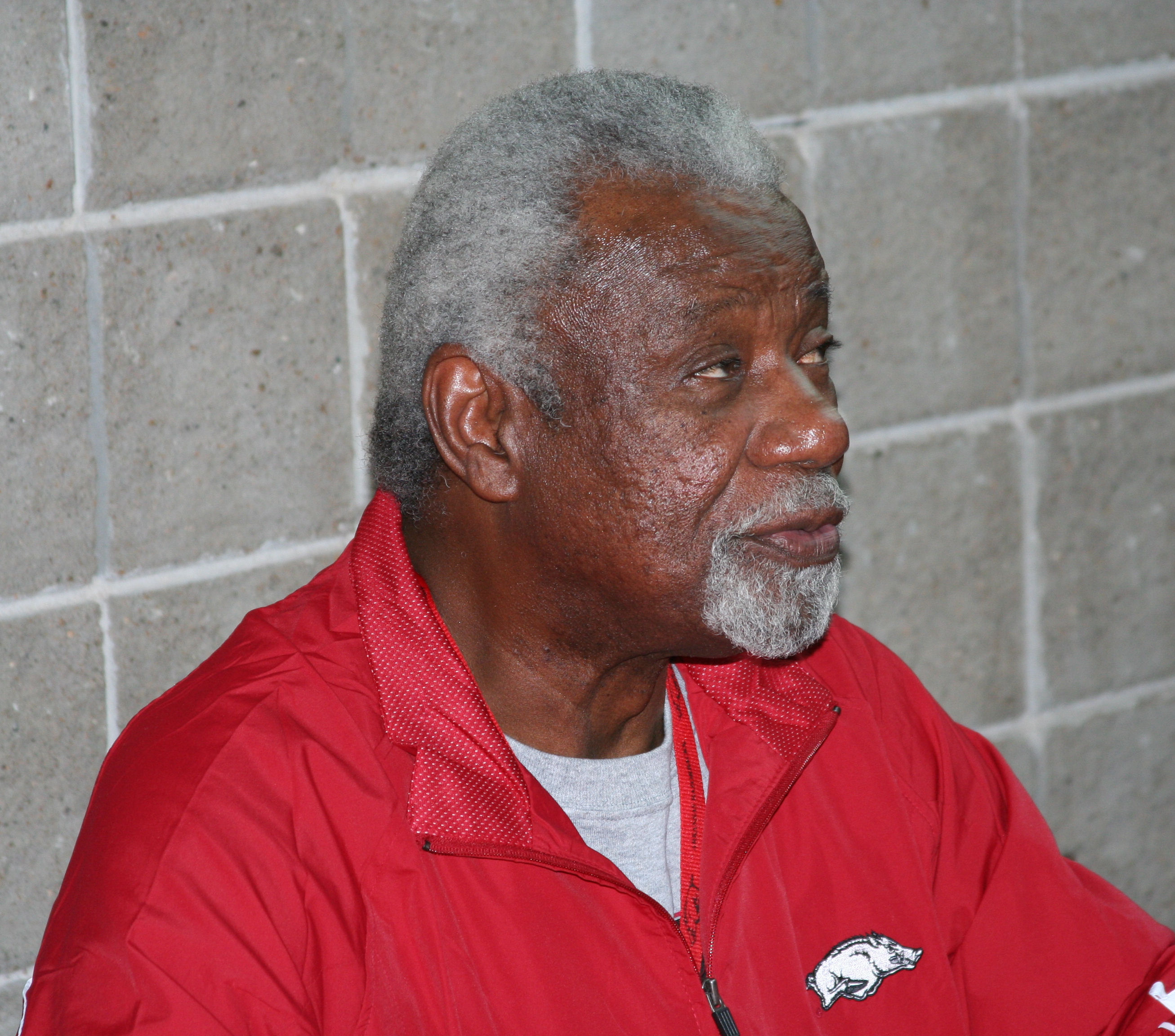
Nolan Richardson, 1994

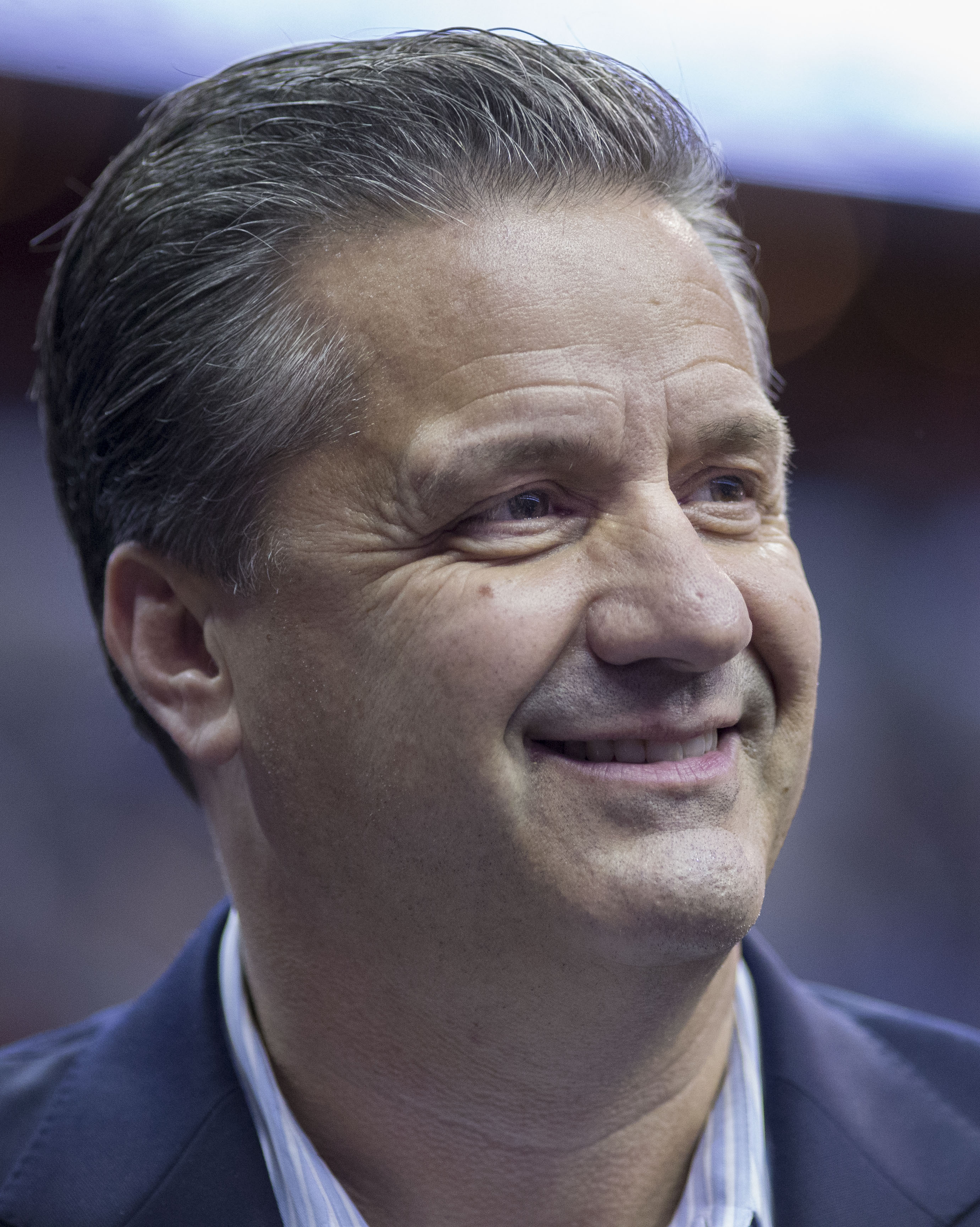
John Calipari, 4× winner

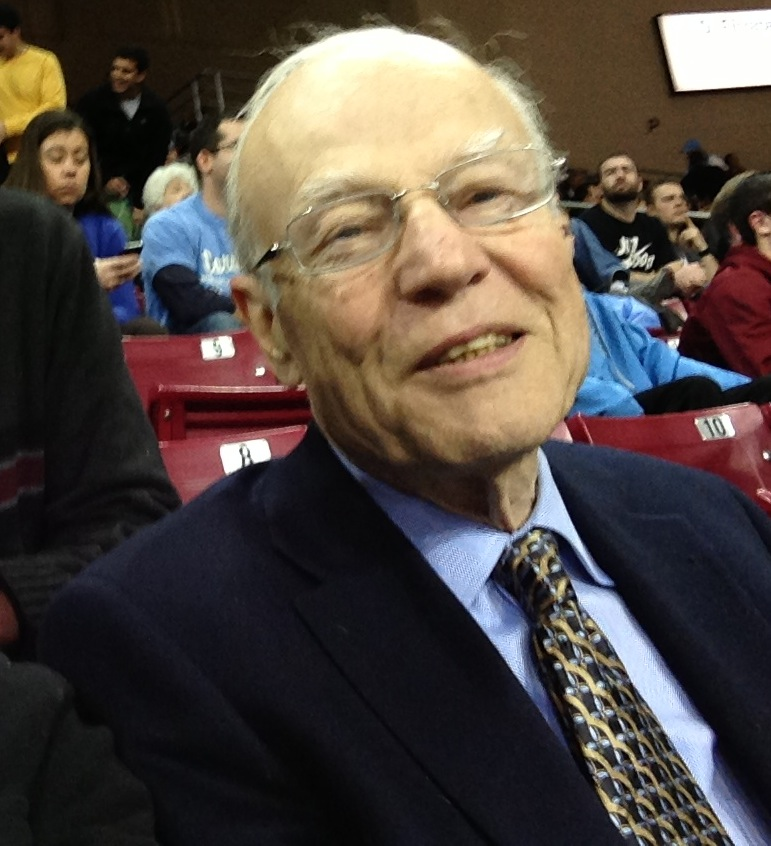
Bill Guthridge, 1998

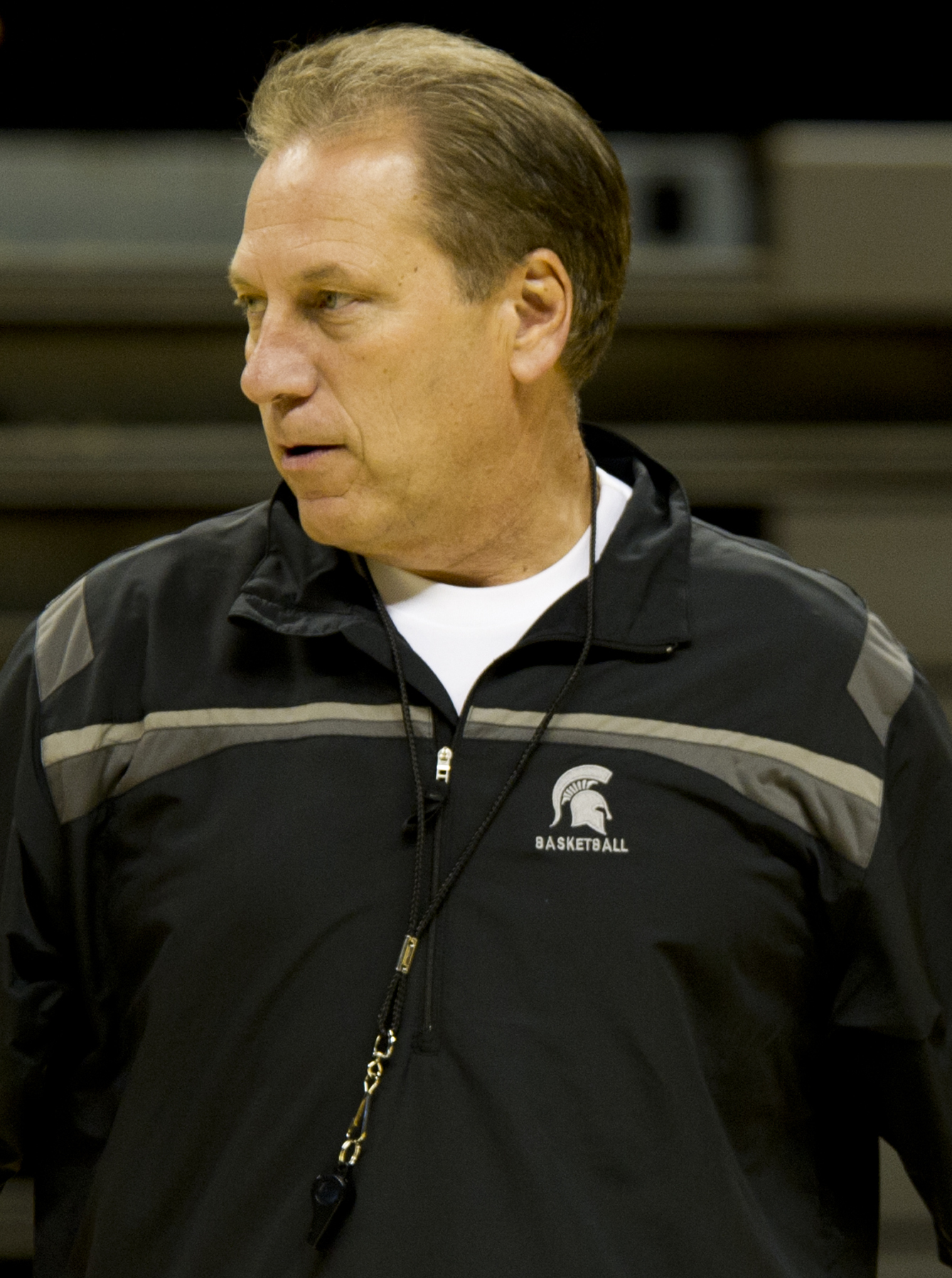
Tom Izzo, 3× winner

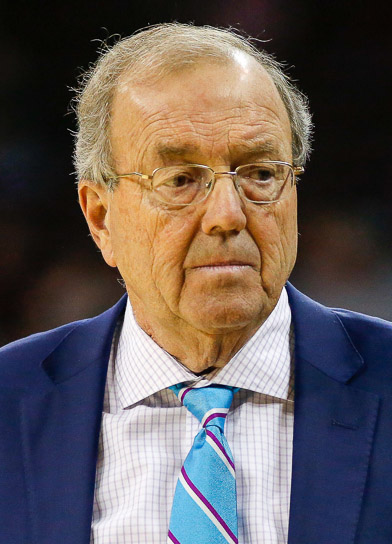
Cliff Ellis, 1999

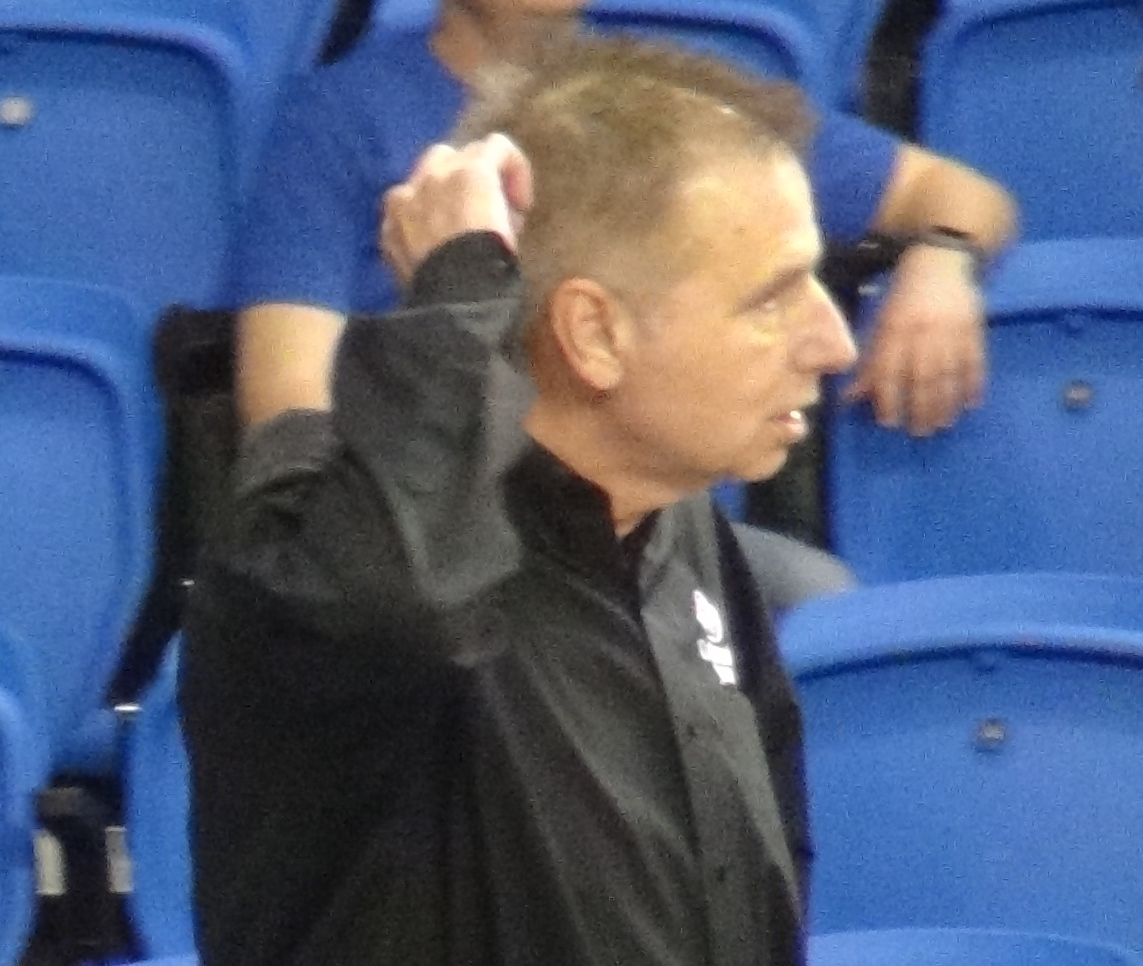
Larry Eustachy, 2000

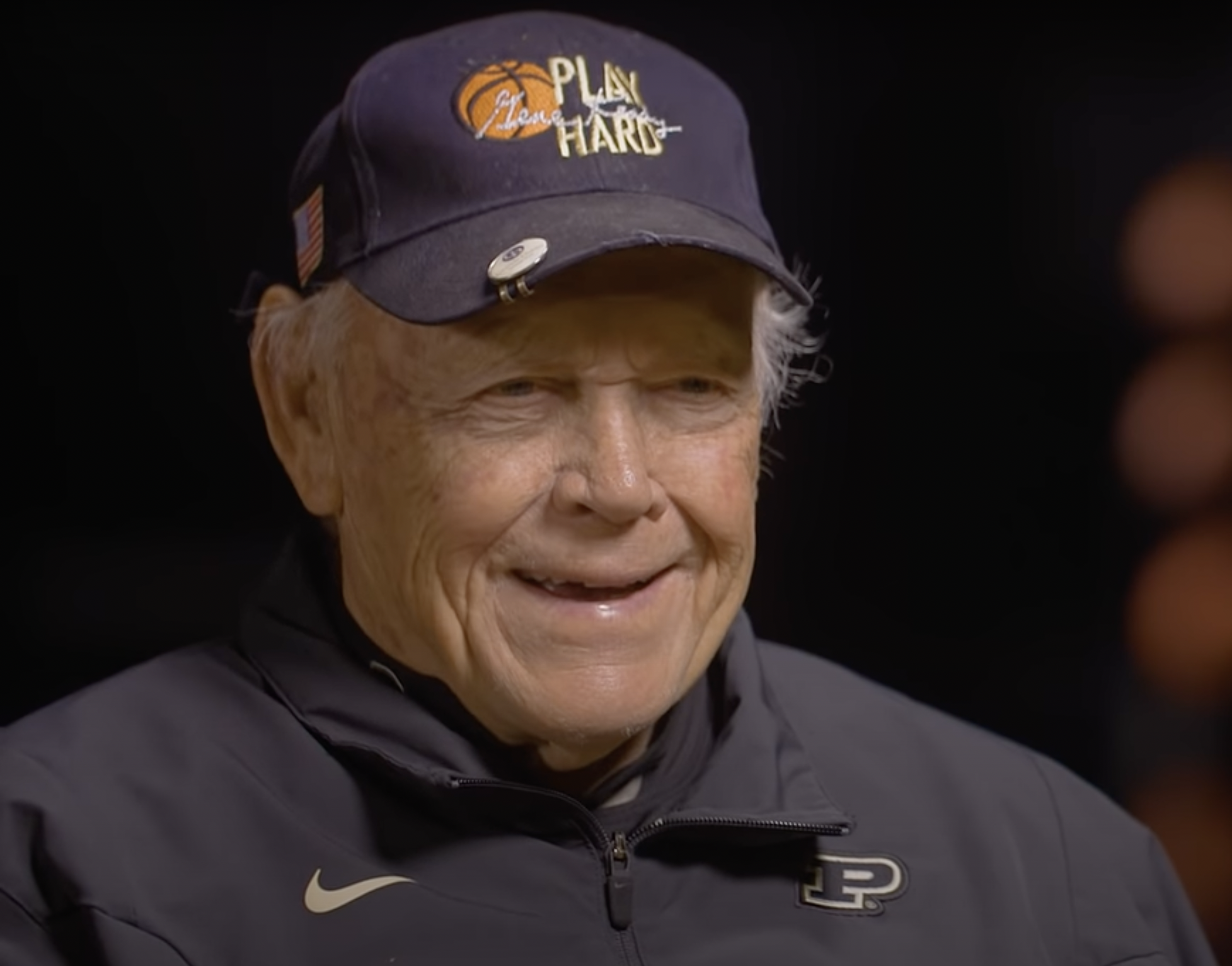
Gene Keady, 4× winner

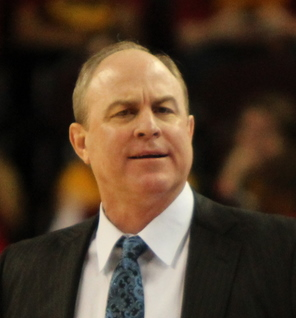
Ben Howland, 2002

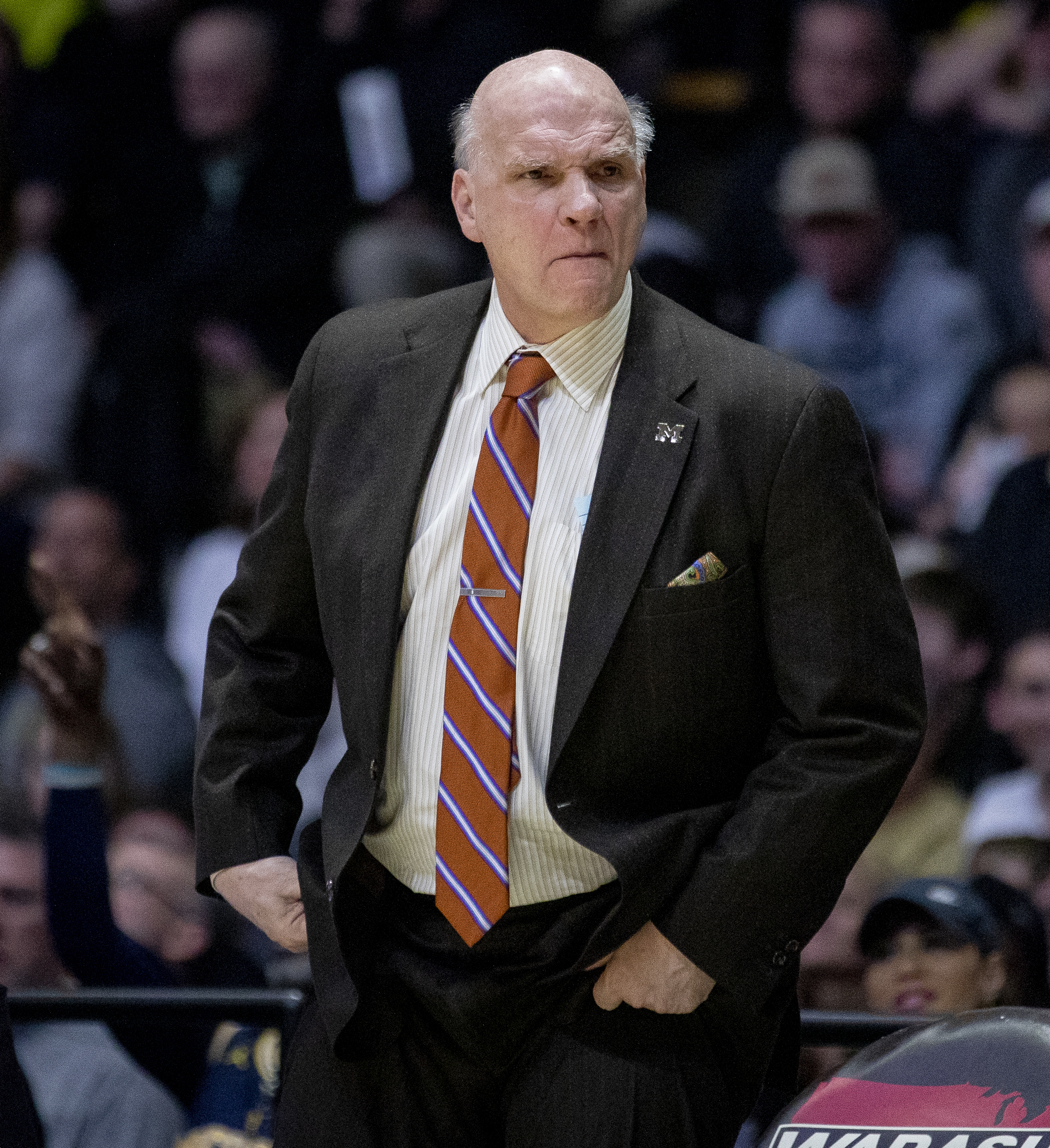
Phil Martelli, 2004

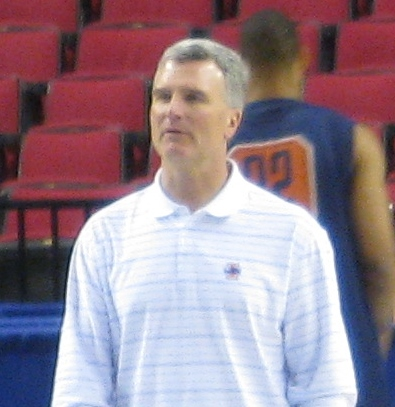
Bruce Weber, 2005

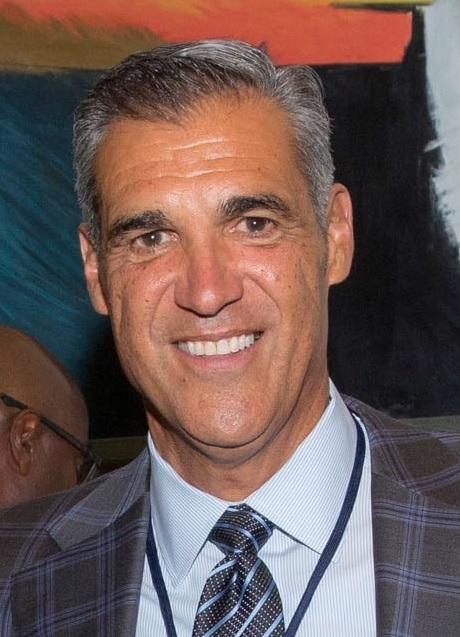
Jay Wright, 2006 and 2016

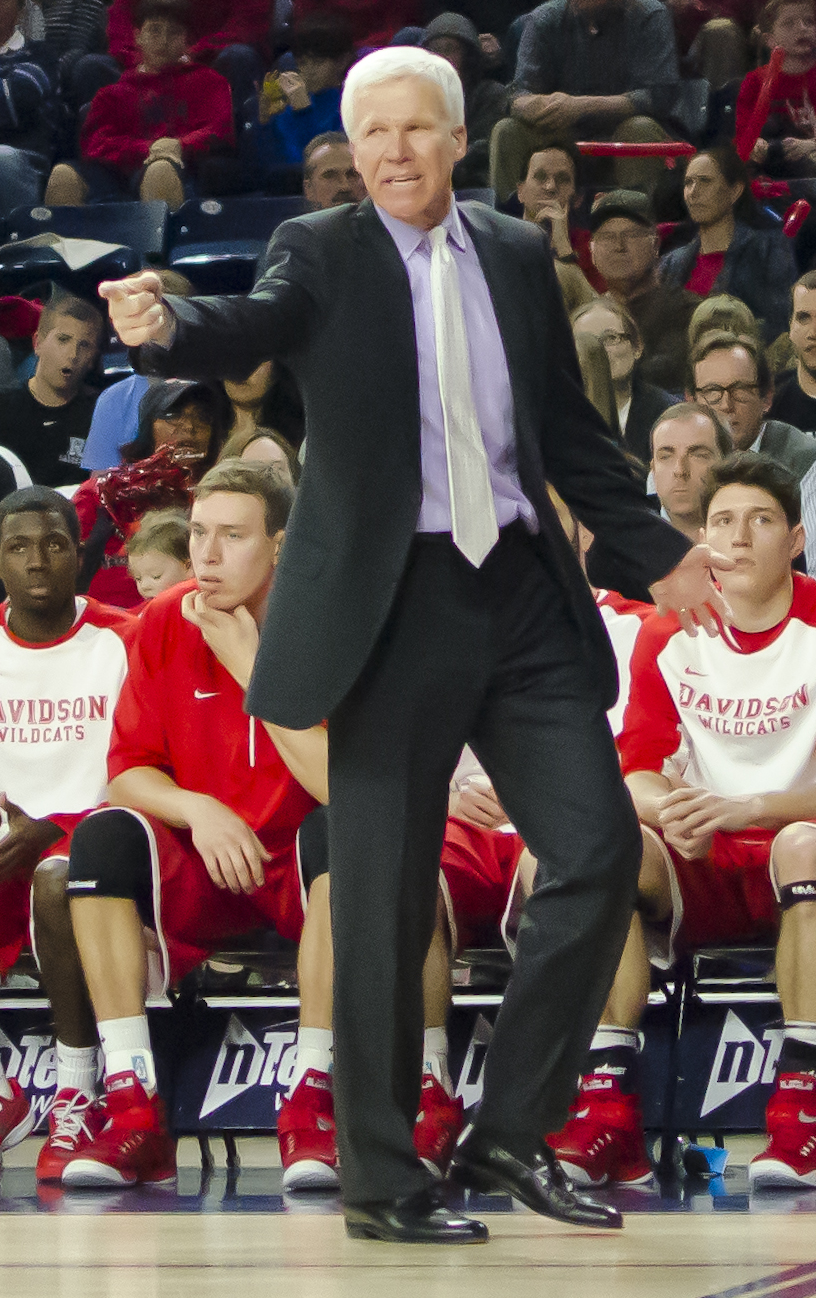
Bob McKillop, 2008

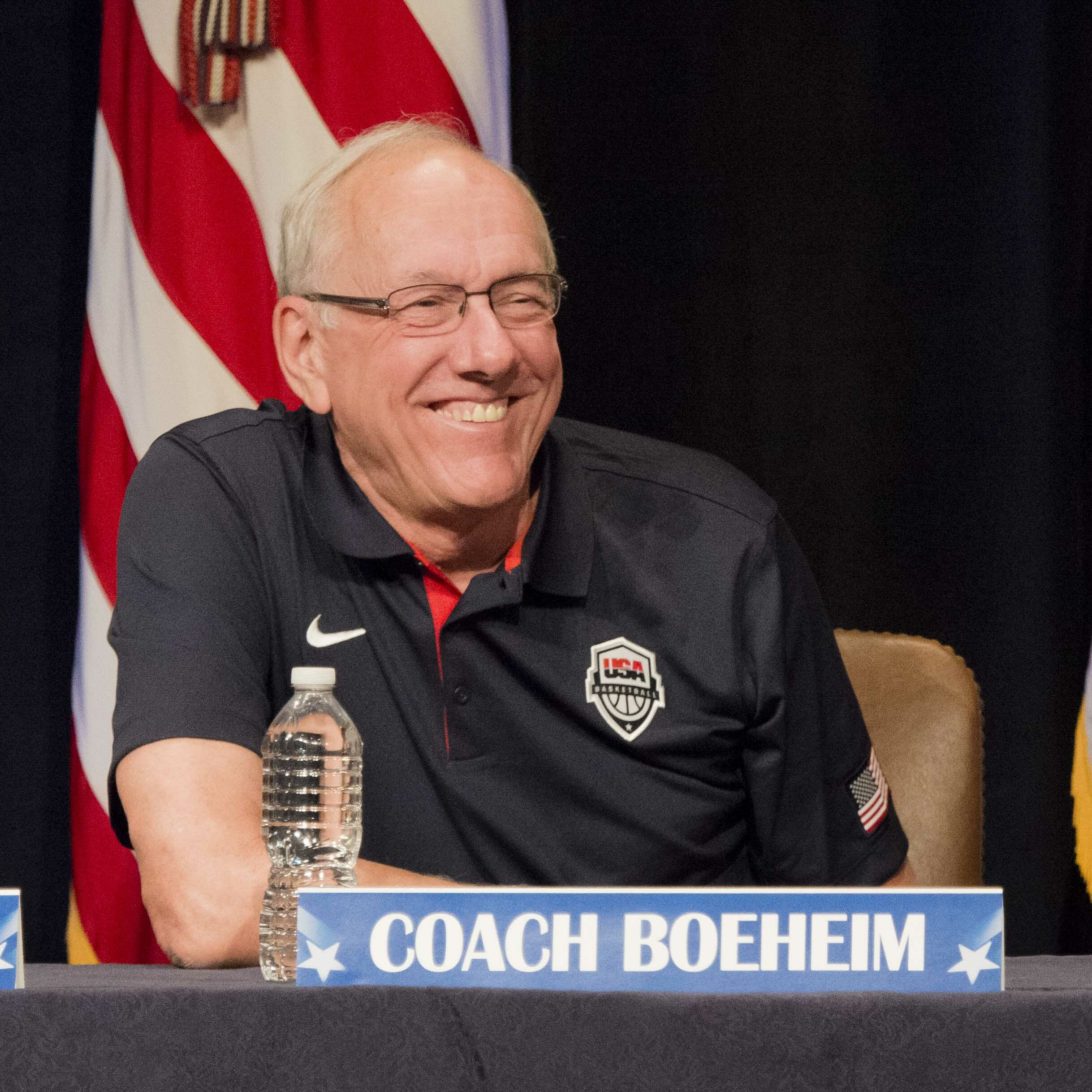
Jim Boeheim, 2010

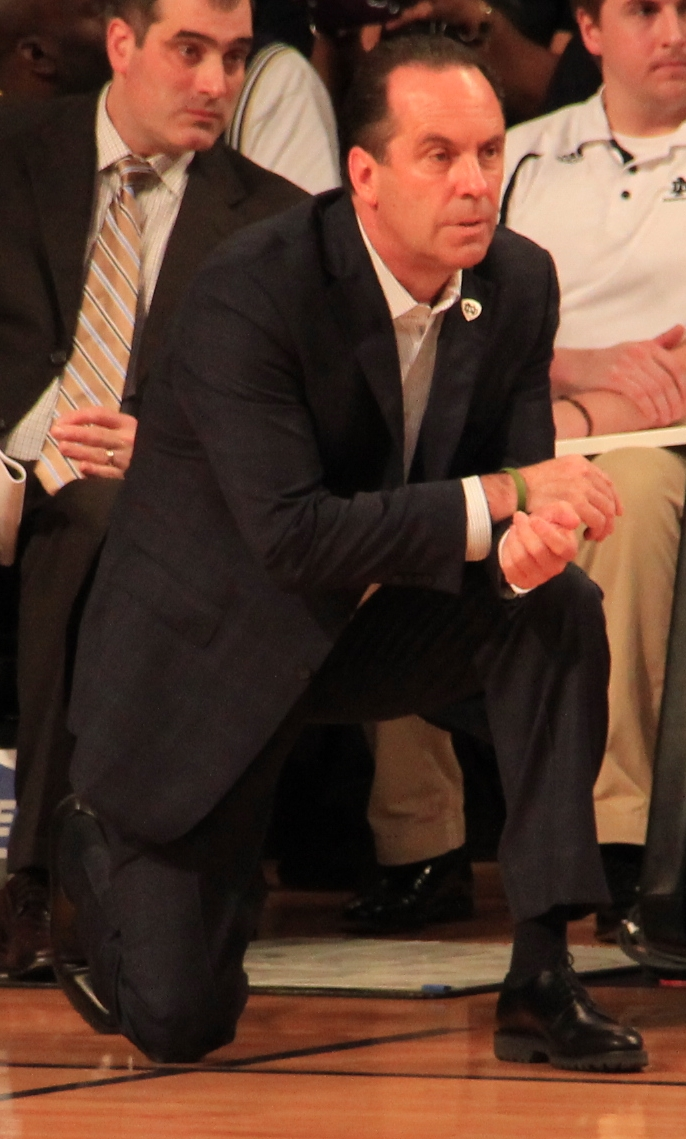
Mike Brey, 2011

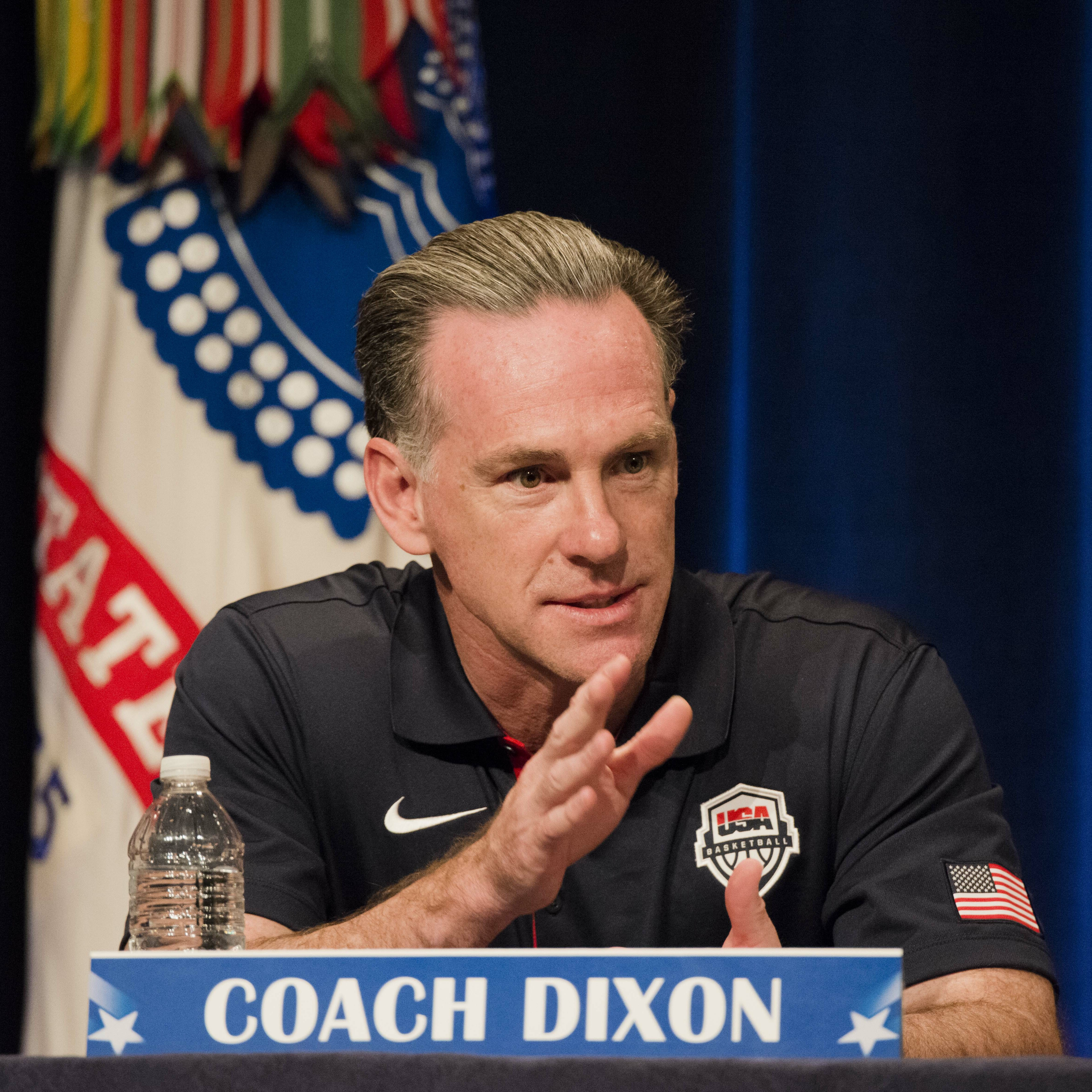
Jamie Dixon, 2009 and 2011

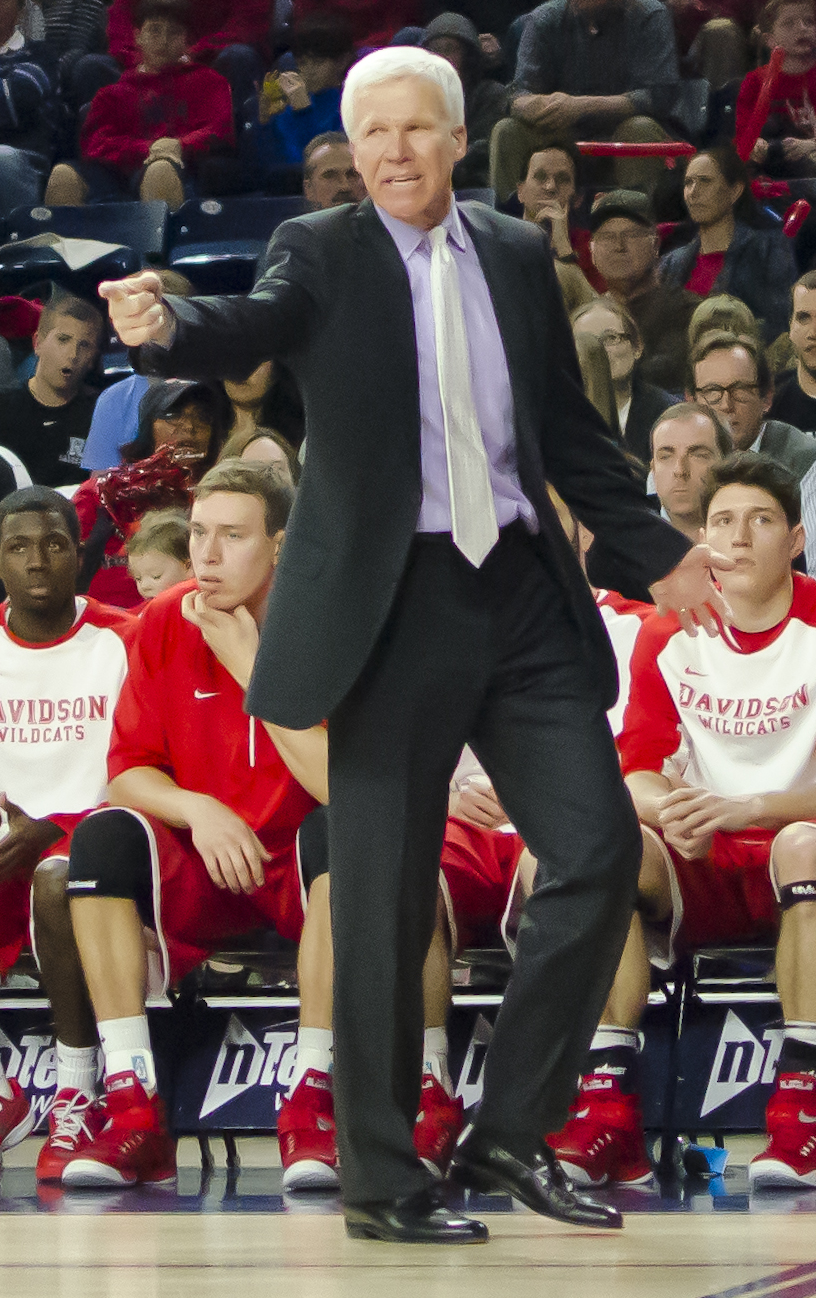
Bob McKillop, 2008

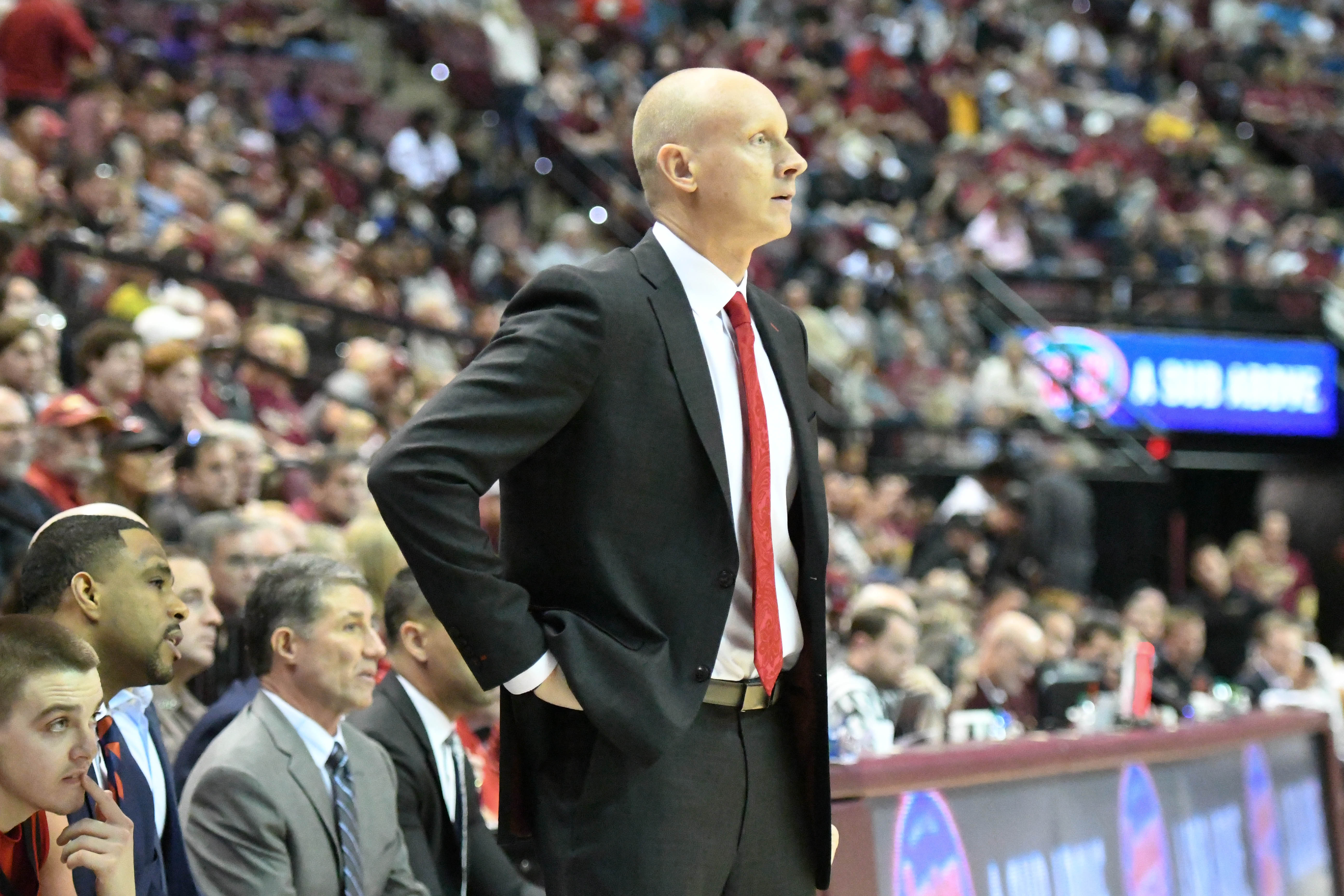
Chris Mack, 2016

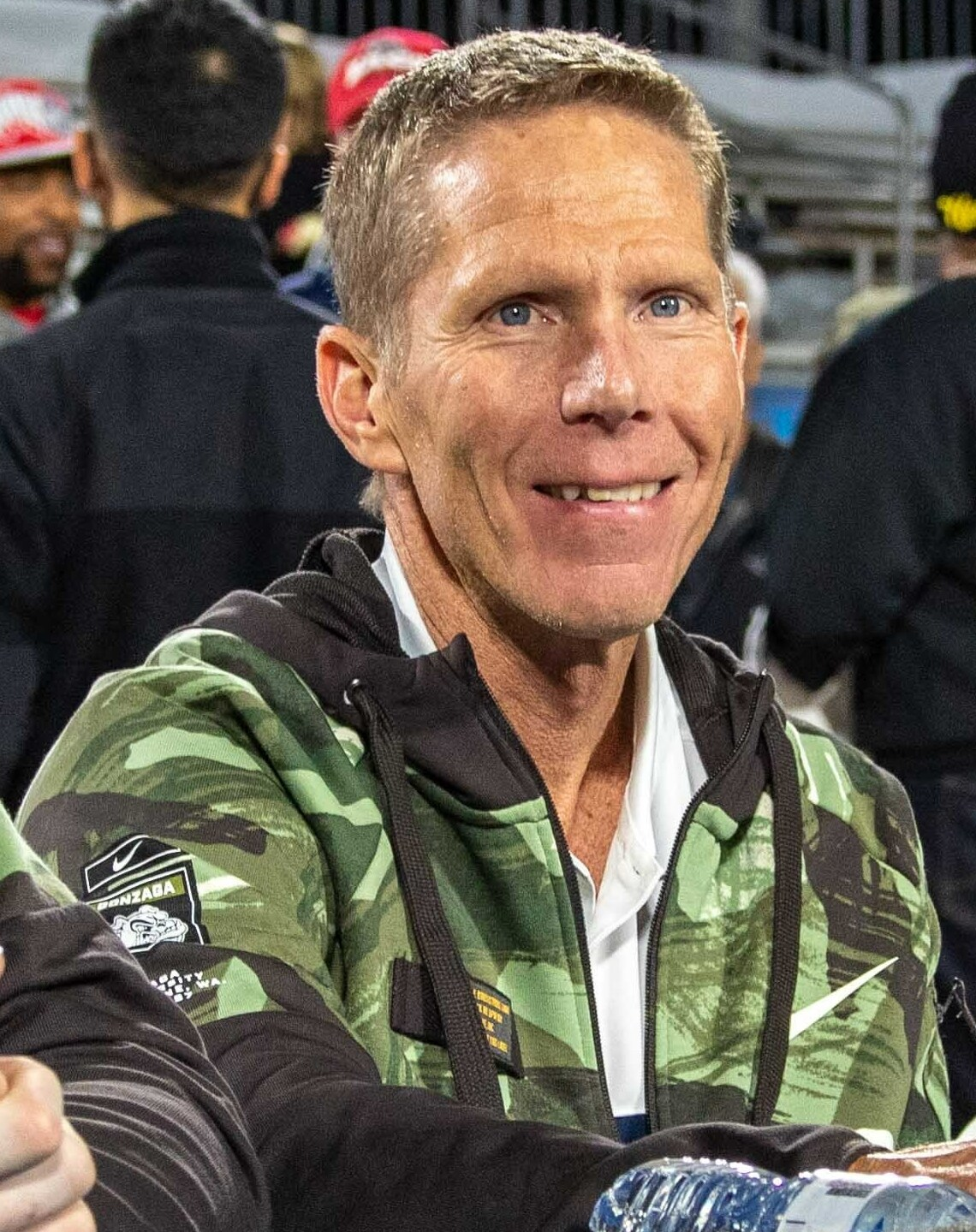
Mark Few, 2017 and 2021

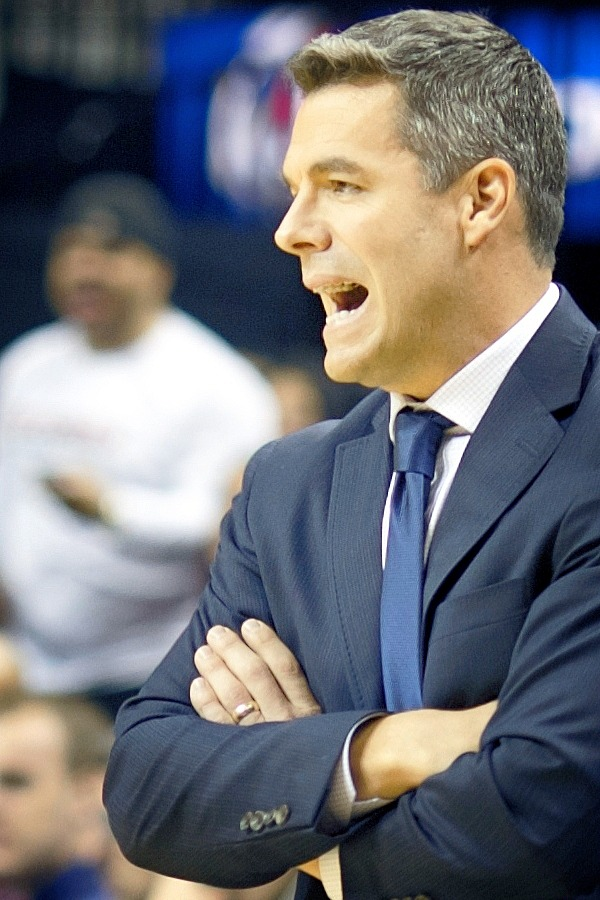
Tony Bennett, 3× winner

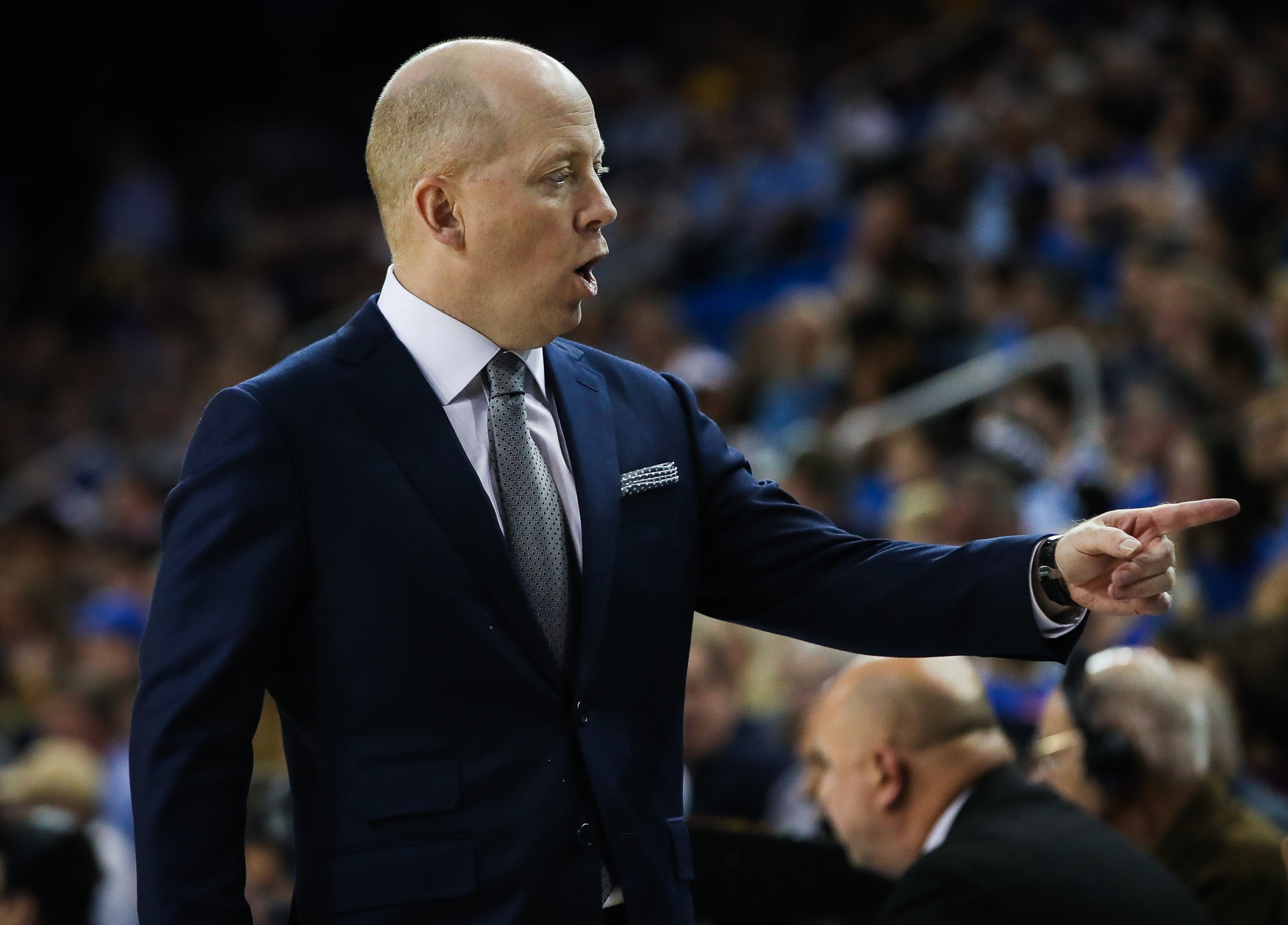
Mick Cronin, 2018

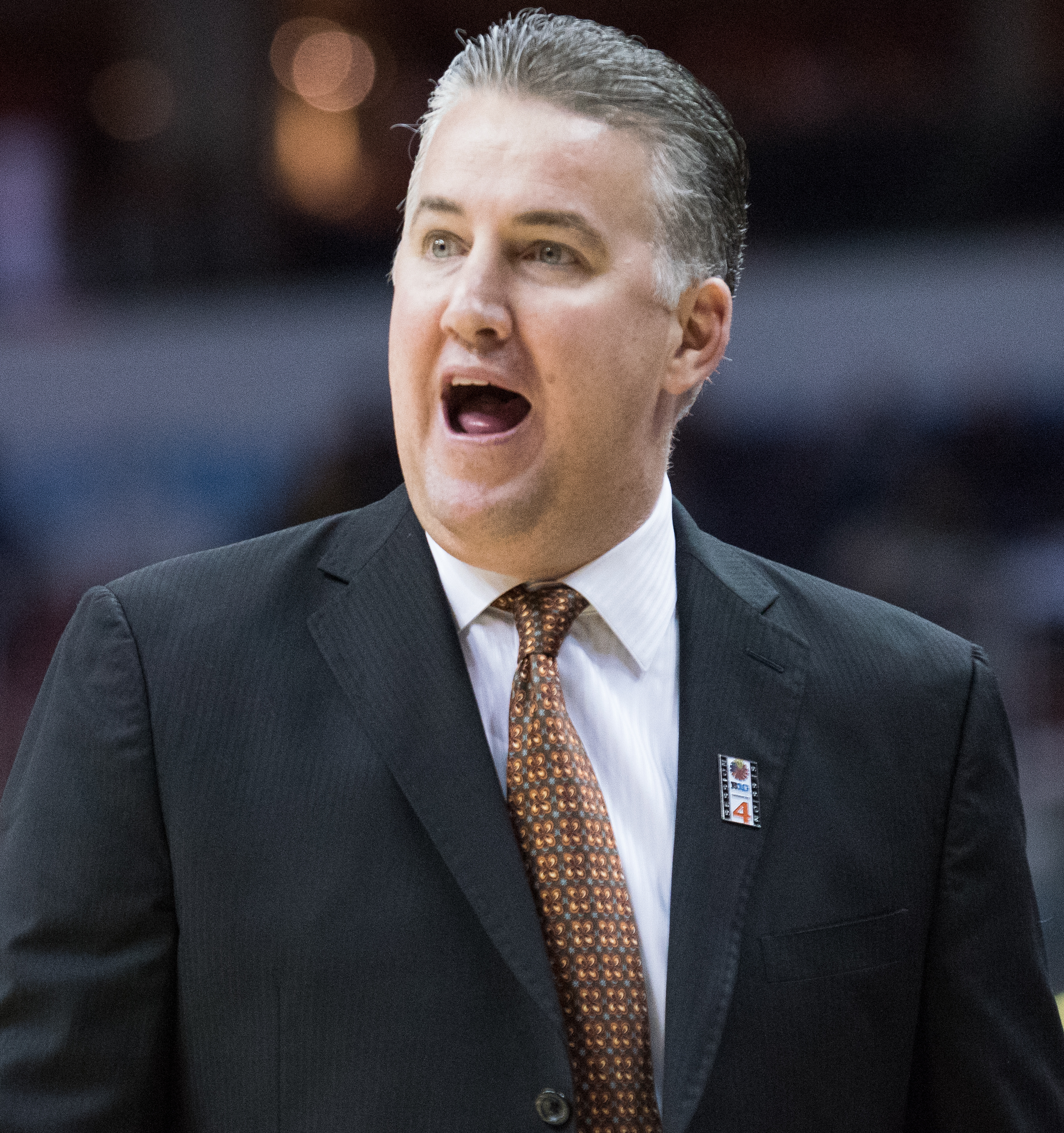
Matt Painter, 2019

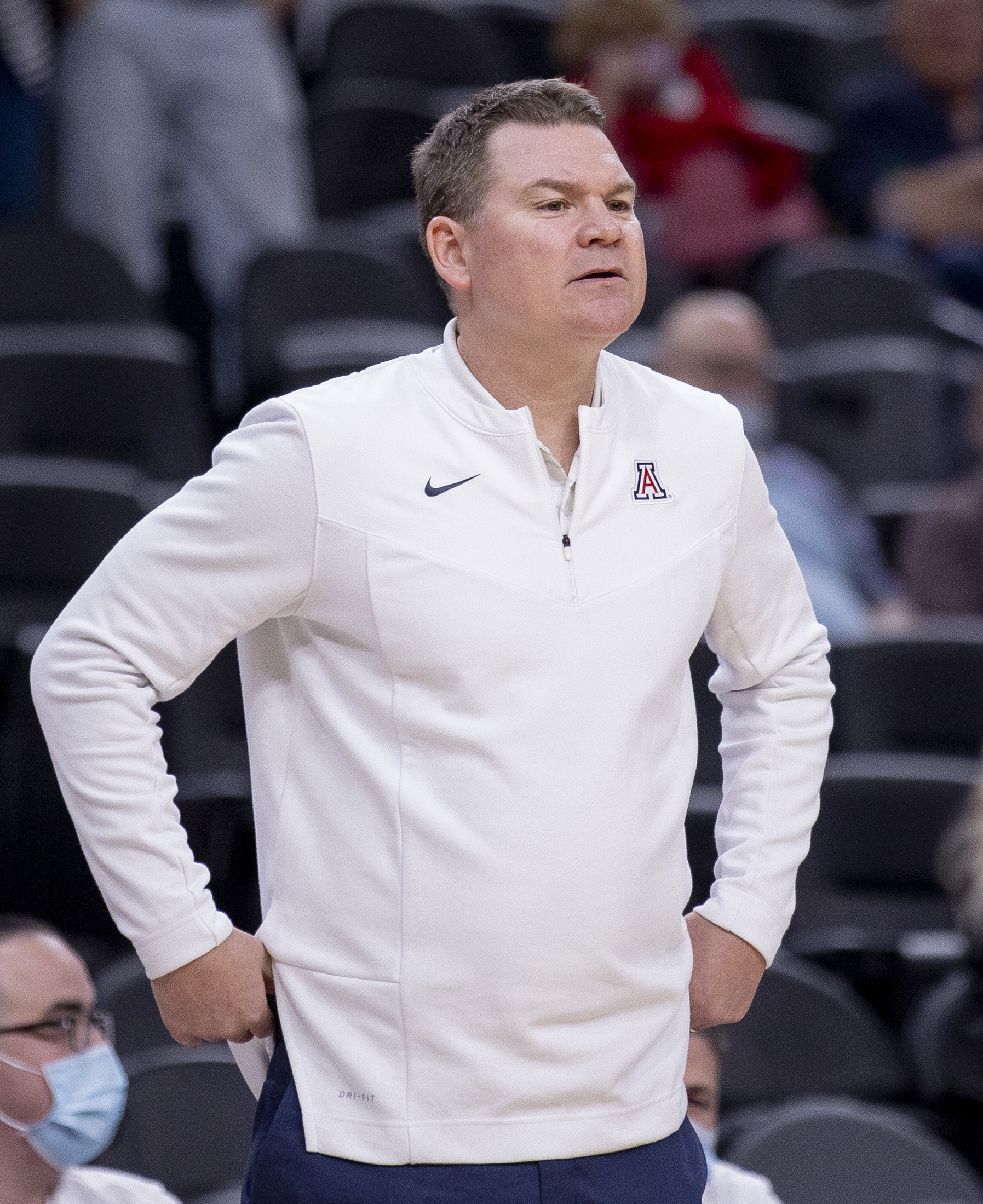
Tommy Lloyd, 2022 and 2026

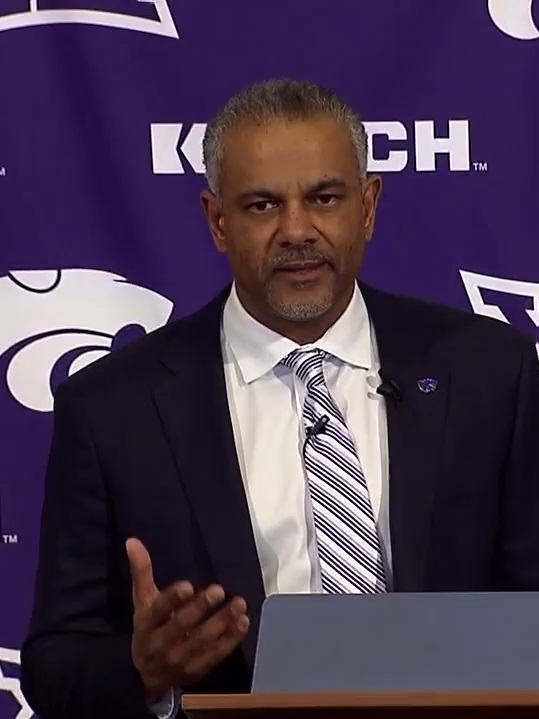
Jerome Tang, 2023

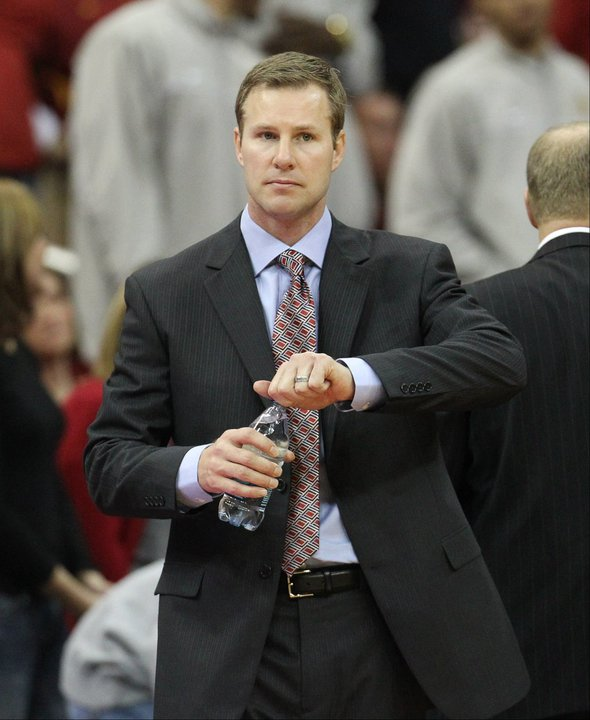
Fred Hoiberg, 2026

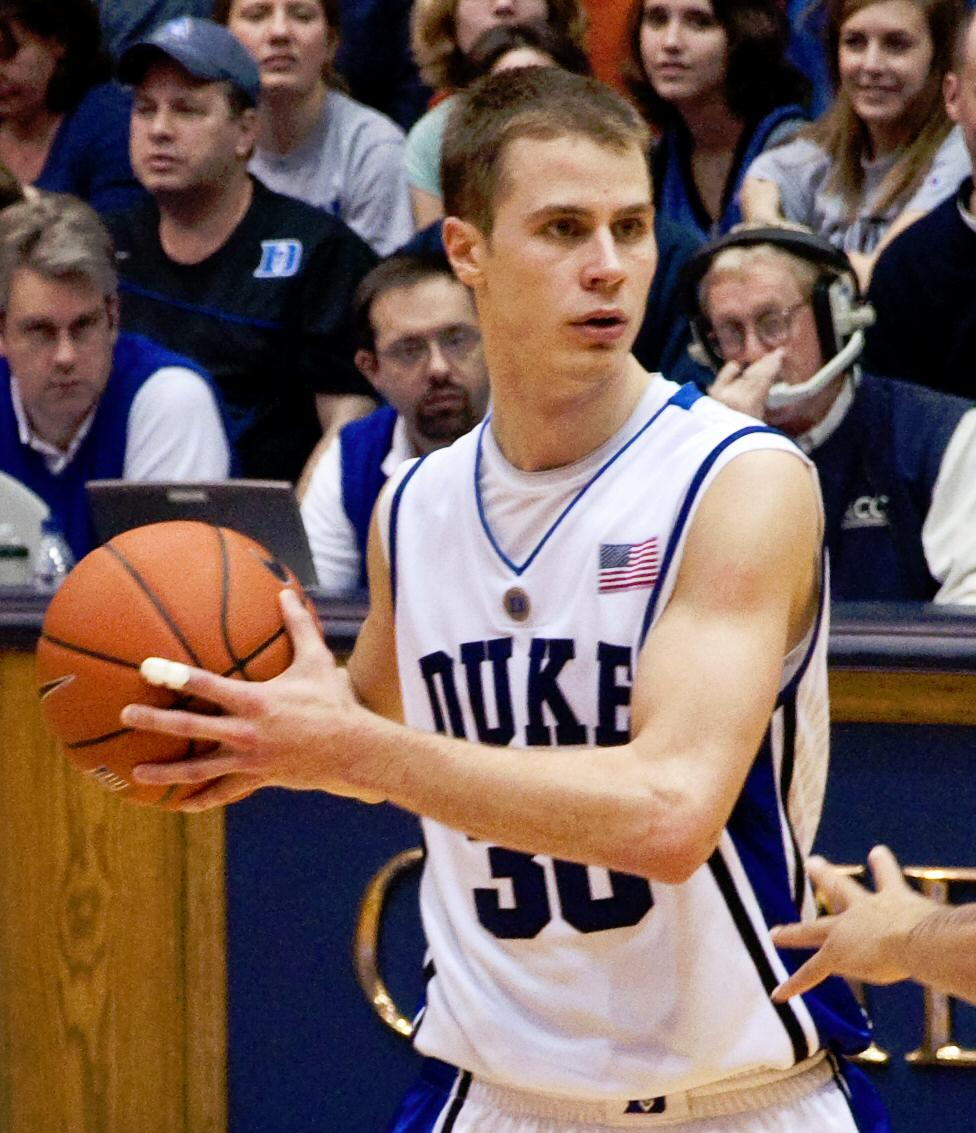
Jon Scheyer, 2026

Season	Coach	School	Henry Iba	NABC	Sporting News	Associated Press	Naismith
1958–59	Eddie Hickey	Marquette	✓	✓	No award	No award	No award
1959–60	Pete Newell	California	✓	✓	No award	No award	No award
1960–61	Fred Taylor	Ohio State	✓	✓	No award	No award	No award
1961–62	Fred Taylor (2)	Ohio State	✓	✓	No award	No award	No award
1962–63	Ed Jucker	Cincinnati	✓	✓	No award	No award	No award
1963–64	John Wooden	UCLA	✓	✓	✓	No award	No award
1964–65	Butch van Breda Kolff	Princeton	✓	✓	No winner selected	No award	No award
1965–66	Adolph Rupp	Kentucky	✓	✓	✓	No award	No award
1966–67^{†}	Jack Hartman	Southern Illinois	✗	✗	✓	✗	No award
1966–67^{†}	John Wooden (2)	UCLA	✓	✓	✗	✓	No award
1967–68	Guy Lewis	Houston	✓	✓	✓	✓	No award
1968–69	John Wooden (3)	UCLA	✓	✓	✓	✓	No award
1969–70^{†}	Adolph Rupp (2)	Kentucky	✗	✗	✓	✗	No award
1969–70^{†}	John Wooden (4)	UCLA	✓	✓	✗	✓	No award
1970–71^{†}	Jack Kraft	Villanova	✗	✓	✗	✗	No award
1970–71^{†}	Al McGuire	Marquette	✗	✗	✓	✓	No award
1970–71^{†}	John Wooden (5)	UCLA	✓	✗	✗	✗	No award
1971–72	John Wooden (6)	UCLA	✓	✓	✓	✓	No award
1972–73^{†}	Gene Bartow	Memphis	✗	✓	✗	✗	No award
1972–73^{†}	John Wooden (7)	UCLA	✓	✗	✓	✓	No award
1973–74^{†}	Al McGuire (2)	Marquette	✗	✓	✗	✗	No award
1973–74^{†}	Digger Phelps	Notre Dame	✗	✗	✓	✗	No award
1973–74^{†}	Norm Sloan	NC State	✓	✗	✗	✓	No award
1974–75	Bob Knight	Indiana	✓	✓	✓	✓	No award
1975–76^{†}	Bob Knight (2)	Indiana	✗	✗	✗	✓	No award
1975–76^{†}	Johnny Orr	Michigan	✓	✓	✗	✗	No award
1975–76^{†}	Tom Young	Rutgers	✗	✗	✓	✗	No award
1976–77^{†}	Bob Gaillard	San Francisco	✗	✗	✗	✓	No award
1976–77^{†}	Lee Rose	Charlotte	✗	✗	✓	✗	No award
1976–77^{†}	Dean Smith	North Carolina	✗	✓	✓	✗	No award
1976–77^{†}	Eddie Sutton	Arkansas	✓	✗	✗	✗	No award
1977–78^{†}	Bill Foster	Duke	✗	✓ ^{T}	✓	✗	No award
1977–78^{†}	Ray Meyer	DePaul	✓	✗	✗	✗	No award
1977–78^{†}	Abe Lemons	Texas	✗	✓ ^{T}	✗	✗	No award
1977–78^{†}	Eddie Sutton (2)	Arkansas	✗	✗	✗	✓	No award
1978–79^{†}	Bill Hodges	Indiana State	✗	✗	✓	✓	No award
1978–79^{†}	Ray Meyer (2)	DePaul	✗	✓	✗	✗	No award
1978–79^{†}	Dean Smith (2)	North Carolina	✓	✗	✗	✗	No award
1979–80^{†}	Ray Meyer (3)	DePaul	✓	✗	✗	✓	No award
1979–80^{†}	Lute Olson	Iowa	✗	✓	✓	✗	No award
1980–81^{†}	Dale Brown	LSU	✗	✗	✓	✗	No award
1980–81^{†}	Jack Hartman (2)	Kansas State	✗	✓ ^{T}	✗	✗	No award
1980–81^{†}	Ralph Miller	Oregon State	✓	✓ ^{T}	✗	✓	No award
1981–82^{†}	Ralph Miller (2)	Oregon State	✗	✗	✓	✓	No award
1981–82^{†}	Don Monson	Idaho	✗	✓	✗	✗	No award
1981–82^{†}	John Thompson	Georgetown	✓	✗	✗	✗	No award
1982–83^{†}	Lou Carnesecca	St. John's	✓	✓	✗	✗	No award
1982–83^{†}	Denny Crum	Louisville	✗	✗	✓	✗	No award
1982–83^{†}	Guy Lewis (2)	Houston	✗	✗	✗	✓	No award
1983–84^{†}	Marv Harshman	Washington	✗	✓	✗	✗	No award
1983–84^{†}	Gene Keady	Purdue	✓	✗	✗	✗	No award
1983–84^{†}	Ray Meyer (4)	DePaul	✗	✗	✗	✓	No award
1983–84^{†}	John Thompson (2)	Georgetown	✗	✗	✓	✗	No award
1984–85^{†}	Lou Carnesecca (2)	St. John's	✓	✗	✓	✗	No award
1984–85^{†}	Bill Frieder	Michigan	✗	✗	✗	✓	No award
1984–85^{†}	John Thompson (3)	Georgetown	✗	✓	✗	✗	No award
1985–86^{†}	Denny Crum (2)	Louisville	✗	✗	✓	✗	No award
1985–86^{†}	Eddie Sutton (3)	Kentucky	✗	✓	✗	✓	No award
1985–86^{†}	Dick Versace	Bradley	✓	✗	✗	✗	No award
1986–87^{†}	John Chaney	Temple	✓	✗	✗	✗	✗
1986–87^{†}	Tom Davis	Iowa	✗	✗	✗	✓	✗
1986–87^{†}	Bob Knight (3)	Indiana	✗	✗	✗	✗	✓
1986–87^{†}	Rick Pitino	Providence	✗	✓	✓	✗	✗
1987–88^{†}	John Chaney (2)	Temple	✓	✓	✓	✓	✗
1987–88^{†}	Larry Brown	Kansas	✗	✗	✗	✗	✓
1988–89^{†}	P. J. Carlesimo	Seton Hall	✗	✓	✓	✗	✗
1988–89^{†}	Bob Knight (4)	Indiana	✓	✗	✗	✓	✗
1988–89^{†}	Mike Krzyzewski	Duke	✗	✗	✗	✗	✓
1989–90^{†}	Jim Calhoun	UConn	✗	✗	✓	✓	✗
1989–90^{†}	Bobby Cremins	Georgia Tech	✗	✗	✗	✗	✓
1989–90^{†}	Jud Heathcote	Michigan State	✗	✓	✗	✗	✗
1989–90^{†}	Roy Williams	Kansas	✓	✗	✗	✗	✗
1990–91^{†}	Randy Ayers	Ohio State	✓	✗	✗	✓	✓
1990–91^{†}	Mike Krzyzewski (2)	Duke	✗	✓	✗	✗	✗
1990–91^{†}	Rick Pitino (2)	Kentucky	✗	✗	✓	✗	✗
1991–92^{†}	Perry Clark	Tulane	✓	✗	✗	✗	✗
1991–92^{†}	Mike Krzyzewski (3)	Duke	✗	✗	✓	✗	✓
1991–92^{†}	George Raveling	USC	✗	✓	✗	✗	✗
1991–92^{†}	Roy Williams (2)	Kansas	✗	✗	✗	✓	✗
1992–93^{†}	Eddie Fogler	Vanderbilt	✓	✓	✓	✓	✗
1992–93^{†}	Dean Smith (3)	North Carolina	✗	✗	✗	✗	✓
1993–94^{†}	Gene Keady (2)	Purdue	✗	✓ ^{T}	✗	✗	✗
1993–94^{†}	Nolan Richardson	Arkansas	✗	✓ ^{T}	✗	✗	✓
1993–94^{†}	Charlie Spoonhour	Saint Louis	✓	✗	✗	✗	✗
1993–94^{†}	Norm Stewart	Missouri	✗	✗	✓	✓	✗
1994–95^{†}	Jim Harrick	UCLA	✗	✓	✗	✗	✓
1994–95^{†}	Jud Heathcote (2)	Michigan State	✗	✗	✓	✗	✗
1994–95^{†}	Kelvin Sampson	Oklahoma	✓	✗	✗	✓	✗
1995–96^{†}	John Calipari	UMass	✗	✓	✓	✗	✓
1995–96^{†}	Gene Keady (3)	Purdue	✓	✗	✗	✓	✗
1996–97^{†}	Clem Haskins	Minnesota	✓	✓	✗	✓	✗
1996–97^{†}	Roy Williams (3)	Kansas	✗	✗	✓	✗	✓
1997–98^{†}	Bill Guthridge	North Carolina	✗	✓	✓	✗	✓
1997–98^{†}	Tom Izzo	Michigan State	✓	✗	✗	✓	✗
1998–99^{†}	Cliff Ellis	Auburn	✓	✗	✓	✓	✗
1998–99^{†}	Mike Krzyzewski (4)	Duke	✗	✓ ^{T}	✗	✗	✓
1998–99^{†}	Jim O'Brien	Ohio State	✗	✓ ^{T}	✗	✗	✗
1999–00^{†}	Larry Eustachy	Iowa State	✓	✗	✗	✓	✗
1999–00^{†}	Bob Huggins	Cincinnati	✗	✗	✓ ^{T}	✗	✗
1999–00^{†}	Gene Keady (4)	Purdue	✗	✓	✗	✗	✗
1999–00^{†}	Mike Montgomery	Stanford	✗	✗	✗	✗	✓
1999–00^{†}	Bill Self	Tulsa	✗	✗	✓ ^{T}	✗	✗
2000–01^{†}	Rod Barnes	Ole Miss	✗	✗	✗	✗	✓
2000–01^{†}	Matt Doherty	North Carolina	✗	✗	✗	✓	✗
2000–01^{†}	Tom Izzo (2)	Michigan State	✗	✓	✗	✗	✗
2000–01^{†}	Al Skinner	Boston College	✓	✗	✓	✗	✗
2001–02^{†}	Ben Howland	Pittsburgh	✓	✗	✓	✓	✓
2001–02^{†}	Kelvin Sampson (2)	Oklahoma	✗	✓	✗	✗	✗
2002–03	Tubby Smith	Kentucky	✓	✓	✓	✓	✓
2003–04^{†}	Phil Martelli	Saint Joseph's	✓	✓ ^{T}	✗	✓	✓
2003–04^{†}	Mike Montgomery (2)	Stanford	✗	✓ ^{T}	✓	✗	✗
2004–05	Bruce Weber	Illinois	✓	✓	✓	✓	✓
2005–06^{†}	Bruce Pearl	Tennessee	✗	✗	✓	✗	✗
2005–06^{†}	Roy Williams (4)	North Carolina	✓	✗	✗	✓	✗
2005–06^{†}	Jay Wright	Villanova	✗	✓	✗	✗	✓
2006–07^{†}	Tony Bennett	Washington State	✓	✗	✓	✓	✓
2006–07^{†}	Todd Lickliter	Butler	✗	✓	✗	✗	✗
2007–08^{†}	John Calipari (2)	Memphis	✗	✗	✗	✗	✓
2007–08^{†}	Keno Davis	Drake	✓	✗	✓	✓	✗
2007–08^{†}	Bob McKillop	Davidson	✗	✓	✗	✗	✗
2008–09^{†}	Mike Anderson	Missouri	✗	✓ ^{T}	✗	✗	✗
2008–09^{†}	John Calipari (3)	Memphis	✗	✓ ^{T}	✗	✗	✗
2008–09^{†}	Jamie Dixon	Pittsburgh	✗	✗	✗	✗	✓
2008–09^{†}	Bill Self (2)	Kansas	✓	✗	✓	✓	✗
2009–10	Jim Boeheim	Syracuse	✓	✓	✓	✓	✓
2010–11^{†}	Mike Brey	Notre Dame	✓	✗	✗	✓	✗
2010–11^{†}	Jamie Dixon (2)	Pittsburgh	✗	✗	✓	✗	✗
2010–11^{†}	Steve Fisher	San Diego State	✗	✓	✗	✗	✓
2011–12^{†}	Frank Haith	Missouri	✓	✗	✗	✓	✗
2011–12^{†}	Tom Izzo (3)	Michigan State	✗	✓	✗	✗	✗
2011–12^{†}	Bill Self (3)	Kansas	✗	✗	✓	✗	✓
2012–13^{†}	Jim Crews	Saint Louis	✗	✓	✓	✗	✗
2012–13^{†}	Jim Larrañaga	Miami (Florida)	✓	✗	✗	✓	✓
2013–14	Gregg Marshall	Wichita State	✓	✓	✓	✓	✓
2014–15^{†}	Tony Bennett (2)	Virginia	✓	✗	✗	✗	✗
2014–15^{†}	John Calipari (4)	Kentucky	✗	✓	✓	✓	✓
2015–16^{†}	Chris Mack	Xavier	✓	✗	✗	✗	✗
2015–16^{†}	Bill Self (4)	Kansas	✗	✓	✗	✓	✗
2015–16^{†}	Tubby Smith (2)	Texas Tech	✗	✗	✓	✗	✗
2015–16^{†}	Jay Wright (2)	Villanova	✗	✗	✗	✗	✓
2016–17	Mark Few	Gonzaga	✓	✓	✓	✓	✓
2017–18^{†}	Tony Bennett (3)	Virginia	✓	✓	✗	✓	✓
2017–18^{†}	Mick Cronin	Cincinnati	✗	✗	✓	✗	✗
2018–19^{†}	Rick Barnes	Tennessee	✓	✗	✗	✗	✓
2018–19^{†}	Chris Beard	Texas Tech	✗	✗	✗	✓	✗
2018–19^{†}	Matt Painter	Purdue	✗	✓	✗	✗	✗
2018–19^{†}	Mike Young	Wofford	✗	✗	✓	✗	✗
2019–20	Anthony Grant	Dayton	✓	✓	✓	✓	✓
2020–21^{†}	Mark Few (2)	Gonzaga	✗	✓	✗	✗	✓
2020–21^{†}	Juwan Howard	Michigan	✓	✗	✓	✓	✗
2021–22^{†}	Ed Cooley	Providence	✗	✗	✓	✗	✓
2021–22^{†}	Tommy Lloyd	Arizona	✓	✓	✗	✓	✗
2022–23^{†}	Shaka Smart	Marquette	✓	✓	✓	✓	✓
2022–23^{†}	Jerome Tang	Kansas State	✗	✗	✗	✗	✓
2022–23^{†}	Rodney Terry	Texas	✗	✗	✓	✗	✗
2023–24^{†}	Dan Hurley	UConn	✗	✗	✓	✗	✓
2023–24^{†}	Kelvin Sampson (3)	Houston	✓	✓	✗	✓	✗
2024–25^{†}	Bruce Pearl (2)	Auburn	✗	✓	✗	✓ ^{T}	✗
2024–25^{†}	Rick Pitino (3)	St. John's	✓	✗	✗	✓ ^{T}	✓
2024–25^{†}	Kelvin Sampson (4)	Houston	✗	✗	✓	✗	✗
2025–26^{†}	Fred Hoiberg	Nebraska	✗	✗	✗	✓	✗
2025–26^{†}	Tommy Lloyd (2)	Arizona	✗	✗	✓	✗	✓
2025–26^{†}	Dusty May	Michigan	✓	✗	✗	✗	✗
2025–26^{†}	Jon Scheyer	Duke	✗	✓	✗	✗	✗

== See also ==
- List of U.S. men's college basketball national player of the year awards
