= 1977 Sun Belt Conference men's basketball tournament =

- Classification: Division I
- Season: 1976–77
- Teams: 6
- Site: Charlotte Coliseum; Charlotte, NC
- Champions: UNC Charlotte (1st title)
- Winning coach: Lee Rose (1st title)
- MVP: Cedric Maxwell (UNC Charlotte)

1976–77 Sun Belt Conference men's basketball standings
	Conf.				Overall
Team	W		L	PCT	W		L	PCT
No. 17 UNC Charlotte †	5	–	1	.833	28	–	5	.848
New Orleans	4	–	2	.667	18	–	10	.643
South Alabama	3	–	3	.500	17	–	10	.630
Jacksonville	2	–	4	.333	10	–	19	.345
South Florida	2	–	4	.333	9	–	18	.333
Georgia State	2	–	4	.333	10	–	18	.357
† 1977 Sun Belt Conference tournament winner Rankings from AP Poll

The 1977 Sun Belt Conference men's basketball tournament was held February 27–March 11 at a combination of on-campus gymnasiums and the Charlotte Coliseum in Charlotte, North Carolina. This was the first edition of the tournament.

UNC Charlotte defeated New Orleans in the championship game, 71–70, to win their first Sun Belt men's basketball tournament.

The 49ers, in turn, received an automatic bid to the 1977 NCAA tournament, where they defeated Central Michigan, Syracuse, and Michigan on their way to the Final Four before falling to eventual-champions Marquette.

== Format ==
All six of the conference's members participated in the tournament field. They were seeded based on regular season conference records with the top two teams earning byes to the semifinal round. Quarter-Final games were played at the campus gym of the higher-seeded team. The Semi-Finals and Championship game, meanwhile, were played at the Charlotte Coliseum in Charlotte, North Carolina.

== Bracket ==
Quarterfinals; Sunday, February 27
5	South Florida	49
4	Jacksonville	64
3	South Alabama	81
6	Georgia State	82*

Semifinals; Tuesday, March 8
1	#18 UNC Charlotte	74
4	Jacksonville	69
6	Georgia State	66
2	New Orleans	86

Championship; Wednesday, March 9
1	#18 UNC Charlotte	71
2	New Orleans	70
Third place Friday, March 11
4	Jacksonville	102
6	Georgia State	72
