= 1976–77 UNC Charlotte 49ers men's basketball team =

American college basketball season

1976–77 UNC Charlotte 49ers men's basketball

Sun Belt Regular Season champion Sun Belt Tournament champion

NCAA tournament, Final Four
- Conference: Sun Belt Conference

Ranking
- AP: No. 17
- Record: 28–5 (5–1 Sun Belt)
- Head coach: Lee Rose (2nd season)
- Assistant coaches: Everett Bass; Mike Pratt
- Home arena: Charlotte Coliseum; Belk Gymnasium (alternate)

1976–77 Sun Belt Conference men's basketball standings
	Conf.				Overall
Team	W		L	PCT	W		L	PCT
No. 17 UNC Charlotte †	5	–	1	.833	28	–	5	.848
New Orleans	4	–	2	.667	18	–	10	.643
South Alabama	3	–	3	.500	17	–	10	.630
Jacksonville	2	–	4	.333	10	–	19	.345
South Florida	2	–	4	.333	9	–	18	.333
Georgia State	2	–	4	.333	10	–	18	.357
† 1977 Sun Belt Conference tournament winner Rankings from AP Poll

The 1976–77 UNC Charlotte 49ers men's basketball team represented the University of North Carolina at Charlotte in the 1976–77 college basketball season. This was head coach Lee Rose's second season at Charlotte. The 49ers competed in the Sun Belt Conference and played their home games at the original Charlotte Coliseum. They finished the season 28–5 (5–1 in Sun Belt play) and won the Sun Belt tournament to receive a bid to the 1977 NCAA tournament. The 49ers would defeat Central Michigan, No. 6 Syracuse, and No. 1 Michigan to reach the Final Four (to date, the only appearance in school history). Charlotte lost a 2-point game to the eventual national champion, Marquette, in the national semifinals before falling to UNLV in the consolation game.

== Roster ==
1976–77 Charlotte 49ers men's basketball team
Players
Coaches

Pos.	#	Name	Height	Weight	Year	Hometown
G	12	Jeff Gruber	6 ft 0 in (1.83 m)	155 lb (70 kg)	Jr	Cary, North Carolina
G	21	Chad Kinch	6 ft 4 in (1.93 m)	186 lb (84 kg)	Fr	Perth Amboy, New Jersey
G	22	Todd Crowley	6 ft 4 in (1.93 m)	170 lb (77 kg)	Fr	Charlotte, North Carolina
F	23	Lew Massey	6 ft 4 in (1.93 m)	202 lb (92 kg)	Jr	Charlotte, North Carolina
G	24	Lee Whitfield	6 ft 1 in (1.85 m)	160 lb (73 kg)	Fr	Charlotte, North Carolina
F	25	Kevin King	6 ft 7 in (2.01 m)	200 lb (91 kg)	So	Lakewood, New Jersey
F	31	Phil Scott	6 ft 6 in (1.98 m)	170 lb (77 kg)	Fr	Columbia, Maryland
G	32	Melvin Watkins	6 ft 4 in (1.93 m)	204 lb (93 kg)	Sr	Reidsville, North Carolina
C	33	Cedric Maxwell	6 ft 8 in (2.03 m)	202 lb (92 kg)	Sr	Kinston, North Carolina
F	43	Ken Angel	6 ft 8 in (2.03 m)	201 lb (91 kg)	Sr	Covington, Kentucky
F	44	Mike Hester	6 ft 7 in (2.01 m)	190 lb (86 kg)	Fr	Burlington, North Carolina

Head coach

- Lee Rose

Assistant coach(es)

- Everett Bass
- Mike Pratt

Legend

- (C) Team captain
- (S) Suspended
- (I) Ineligible
- (W) Walk-on
- Injured
- Current redshirt

Roster

== Schedule and results ==
Date time, TV	Rank^{#}	Opponent^{#}	Result	Record	Site city, state
Regular season
Nov 27, 1976*	No. 19	Georgia College	W 111–63	1–0	Charlotte Coliseum; Charlotte, North Carolina
Dec 1, 1976*	No. 20	Eastern Kentucky	W 104–62	2–0	Charlotte Coliseum; Charlotte, North Carolina
Dec 4, 1976*	No. 20	at No. 15 Tennessee	L 67–69	2–1	Stokely Athletic Center; Knoxville, Tennessee
Dec 6, 1976*		Morehead State	W 75–68	3–1	Charlotte Coliseum; Charlotte, North Carolina
Dec 11, 1976*		at New Mexico State; Roadrunner Classic	W 85–81	4–1	Pan American Center; Las Cruces, New Mexico
Dec 12, 1976*		vs. Lamar; Roadrunner Classic	W 91–86	5–1	Pan American Center; Las Cruces, New Mexico
Dec 18, 1976*		at Charleston Southern	W 107–58	6–1	CSU Fieldhouse; North Charleston, South Carolina
Dec 29, 1976*		Brown; Charlotte Classic	W 97–81	7–1	Charlotte Coliseum; Charlotte, North Carolina
Dec 30, 1976*		New Hampshire; Charlotte Classic	W 104–68	8–1	Charlotte Coliseum; Charlotte, North Carolina
Jan 8, 1977*		at UC Santa Barbara	W 80–69	9–1	Rob Gym; Santa Barbara, California
Jan 15, 1977*		Charleston Southern	W 120–87	10–1	Charlotte Coliseum; Charlotte, North Carolina
Jan 19, 1977*		at Appalachian State	W 87–59	11–1	Varsity Gymnasium; Boone, North Carolina
Jan 22, 1977*		at No. 9 Wake Forest	L 72–74	11–2	Winston-Salem Memorial Coliseum; Winston-Salem, North Carolina
Jan 24, 1977*		at Rollins	W 91–76	12–2	Winter Park, Florida
Jan 26, 1977*		Georgia Southern	W 93–77	13–2	Charlotte Coliseum; Charlotte, North Carolina
Jan 29, 1977*		at Florida State	W 76–65	14–2	Tully Gymnasium; Tallahassee, Florida
Jan 31, 1977*		UNC Wilmington	W 83–70	15–2	Charlotte Coliseum; Charlotte, North Carolina
Feb 5, 1977*		at Saint Francis (PA)	L 87–96	15–3	DeGol Arena; Loretto, Pennsylvania
Feb 12, 1977*		at Southern Mississippi	W 102–72	16–3	Reed Green Coliseum; Hattiesburg, Mississippi
Feb 15, 1977*		Birmingham–Southern	W 87–74	17–3	Charlotte Coliseum; Charlotte, North Carolina
Feb 19, 1977*		at Seton Hall	W 85–75	18–3	Walsh Gymnasium; South Orange, New Jersey
Feb 21, 1977*		at Samford	W 95–81	19–3	Birmingham-Jefferson Civic Center; Birmingham, Alabama
Feb 26, 1977*		Buffalo State	W 83–72	20–3	Charlotte Coliseum; Charlotte, North Carolina
Feb 28, 1977*		Creighton	W 85–67	21–3	Charlotte Coliseum; Charlotte, North Carolina
Mar 2, 1977*		at Marshall	W 84–80	22–3	Veterans Memorial Fieldhouse; Huntington, West Virginia
Mar 4, 1977*		Virginia Commonwealth	W 87–72	23–3	Charlotte Coliseum; Charlotte, North Carolina
Sun Belt tournament
Mar 8, 1977*	No. 18	Jacksonville	W 74–69	24–3	Charlotte Coliseum; Charlotte, North Carolina
Mar 9, 1977*	No. 18	New Orleans	W 71–70	25–3	Charlotte Coliseum; Charlotte, North Carolina
NCAA tournament
Mar 13, 1977*	No. 18	vs. Central Michigan; Mideast Regional Quarterfinal	W 91–86 ^{OT}	26–3	Assembly Hall; Bloomington, Indiana
Mar 17, 1977*	No. 17	vs. No. 6 Syracuse; Mideast Regional semifinal – Sweet Sixteen	W 81–59	27–3	Rupp Arena; Lexington, Kentucky
Mar 19, 1977*	No. 17	vs. No. 1 Michigan; Mideast Regional final – Elite Eight	W 75–68	28–3	Rupp Arena; Lexington, Kentucky
Mar 26, 1977*	No. 17	vs. No. 7 Marquette; National semifinal – Final Four	L 49–51	28–4	The Omni; Atlanta, Georgia
Mar 28, 1977*	No. 17	vs. No. 4 UNLV; National 3rd-place game	L 94–106	28–5	The Omni; Atlanta, Georgia
*Non-conference game. ^{#}Rankings from AP Poll. (#) Tournament seedings in parentheses.

== Awards and honors ==
- Cedric Maxwell – Sun Belt Conference Player of the Year
- Lee Rose – Sporting News Coach of the Year, Sun Belt Conference Coach of the Year

== Players in the 1977 NBA draft ==
Round	Pick	Player	NBA club
1	12	Cedric Maxwell	Boston Celtics
4	68	Melvin Watkins	Buffalo Braves
