= Lee Rose (basketball) =

American basketball coach (1936–2022)

Biographical details
- Born: October 23, 1936; Irvine, Kentucky, U.S.
- Died: April 5, 2022 (aged 85); Charlotte, North Carolina, U.S.

Playing career

Basketball
- ?–1958: Transylvania

Baseball
- ?–1958: Transylvania
- Position: Guard (basketball)

Coaching career (HC unless noted)

Basketball
- 1959–1964: Transylvania (assistant)
- 1964–1965: Transylvania (interim HC)
- 1965–1968: Cincinnati (freshmen)
- 1968–1975: Transylvania
- 1975–1978: Charlotte
- 1978–1980: Purdue
- 1980–1986: South Florida
- 1986–1988: San Antonio Spurs (assistant)
- 1988–1989: New Jersey Nets (assistant)
- 1991–1992: Milwaukee Bucks (assistant)
- 1996–2001: Charlotte Hornets (assistant)
- 2007–2008: Charlotte Bobcats (assistant)

Baseball
- 1960–1964: Transylvania

Administrative career (AD unless noted)
- 1968–1975: Transylvania
- 1975–1978: Charlotte

Head coaching record
- Overall: 388–162 (basketball)
- Tournaments: 8–3 (NCAA Division I); 9–5 (NIT)

Accomplishments and honors

Championships
- Basketball; 2 NCAA Division I Regional—Final Four (1977, 1980); 2 Sun Belt regular season (1977, 1978); Sun Belt tournament (1977); Big Ten regular season (1979)

Lee Hyden Rose (October 23, 1936 – April 5, 2022) was an American basketball coach and college athletic administrator. He served as the head men's basketball at Transylvania University, in an interim capacity in 1964–65 and on a permanent basis from 1968 to 1975; the University of North Carolina at Charlotte from 1975 to 1978; Purdue University from 1978 to 1980; and the University of South Florida from 1980 to 1986, compiling a career college basketball coach record in 388–162. Rose twice coached teams to the Final Four of the NCAA Division I basketball tournament, with Charlotte 49ers in 1977 and the Purdue Boilermakers in 1980. After leaving the college ranks, Rose was an assistant coach with several teams in the National Basketball Association (NBA) between 1986 and 2008.

== Collegiate coaching career ==
Rose, a native of Irvine, Kentucky, is a 1958 alumnus of Transylvania University where he served as an assistant coach after graduation under C. M. Newton. He then took a similar position at the University of Cincinnati before returning to his alma mater as head coach and athletic director and recorded 160 wins in eight seasons.

In 1975 he became the head coach and athletic director at UNC Charlotte, where in three seasons he took the 49ers to one NIT championship game (1976) and to the NCAA Final Four (1977). In 1977 he was named The Sporting News National Coach of the Year, the Sun Belt Coach of the Year, and Charlotte's "Citizen of the Year". In three seasons Rose's record at Charlotte was 72–18 (.800).

Rose left Charlotte for Purdue University in 1978. In the 1979 season, he led them to the NIT Championship Game. The 1980 season came under a cloud beginning in February, when it was reported that the University of South Florida asked for permission to interview Rose for the head coach position, which was received. The Boilermakers beat Indiana to reach the Final Four. Rose became one of only ten coaches in NCAA history to take two different schools to the semifinals of the NCAA tournament. Rose later stated that his relationship with athletic director George King was strained. Rose had been interviewed by Fred Schaus (who as assistant athletic director interviewed Rose due to King having surgery) before being hired, and in the first meeting with King, he told Rose that "You'll never make more money than I do." Relations with the players were wavering, with one player reacting to the idea of leaving Purdue the day after the season ended by saying "I hope he leaves". Rose left Purdue after two seasons after compiling a 50–18 (.735) record. It was announced on April 4, 1980 (three days after the Final Four game) that he was hired to be the head coach at the University of South Florida with a salary doubled from the one he had at Purdue; Gene Keady replaced him at Purdue and coached there for 25 years. For his part, Rose stayed in touch with friends at the school along with stating that “I’ve wished many times that it worked out. But it just wasn’t a fit.”. He coached the Bulls to their first postseason appearances in team history, reaching the NIT three times before leaving in July 1986.

== Later career ==
After retiring from the college ranks in 1986 Rose served as an assistant coach for four NBA teams: the San Antonio Spurs (1986–1988); the New Jersey Nets (1988–1989); the Milwaukee Bucks (1991–1992), and the Charlotte Hornets (1996–2001). He also served as the Bucks' vice president of player personnel in the mid-1990s.

Rose and his wife resided in Charlotte, North Carolina, where they attended nearly every Charlotte 49ers basketball game. On June 7, 2007, Rose was hired by the Charlotte Bobcats to be part of head coach Sam Vincent's staff. He has four grandchildren, Lee Rose; Kristi Rose; James Rose; and Alexzander Rose.

Rose died on April 5, 2022, at age 85.

== Head coaching record ==
=== Basketball ===
Record table
Season	Team	Overall	Conference	Standing	Postseason
Transylvania Pioneers () (1964–1965)
1964–65	Transylvania	21–10			
Transylvania Pioneers () (1968–1975)
1968–69	Transylvania	20–7			
1969–70	Transylvania	21–7			
1970–71	Transylvania	21–3			
1971–72	Transylvania	21–6			
1972–73	Transylvania	20–7			
1973–74	Transylvania	16–10			
1974–75	Transylvania	20–7			
Transylvania:		160–57			
Charlotte 49ers (NCAA Division I independent) (1975–1976)
1975–76	Charlotte	24–6			NIT Runner-Up
Charlotte 49ers (Sun Belt Conference) (1976–1978)
1976–77	Charlotte	28–5	5–1	1st	NCAA Division I Fourth Place
1977–78	Charlotte	20–7	9–1	1st	
Charlotte:		72–18	14–2		
Purdue Boilermakers (Big Ten Conference) (1978–1980)
1978–79	Purdue	27–8	13–5	T–1st	NIT Runner-up
1979–80	Purdue	23–10	11–7	3rd	NCAA Division I Third Place
Purdue:		50–18	24–12		
South Florida Bulls (Sun Belt Conference) (1980–1986)
1980–81	South Florida	18–11	7–5	4th	NIT First Round
1981–82	South Florida	17–11	4–6	4th	
1982–83	South Florida	22–10	8–6	4th	NIT Second Round
1983–84	South Florida	17–11	9–5	T–2nd	
1984–85	South Florida	18–12	6–8	T–4th	NIT Second Round
1985–86	South Florida	14–14	5–9	T–6th	
South Florida:		106–69	39–39		
Total:		388–162			
National champion Postseason invitational champion Conference regular season champion Conference regular season and conference tournament champion Division regular season champion Division regular season and conference tournament champion Conference tournament champion

== See also ==
- List of NCAA Division I Men's Final Four appearances by coach
