= Charlotte 49ers men's basketball statistical leaders =

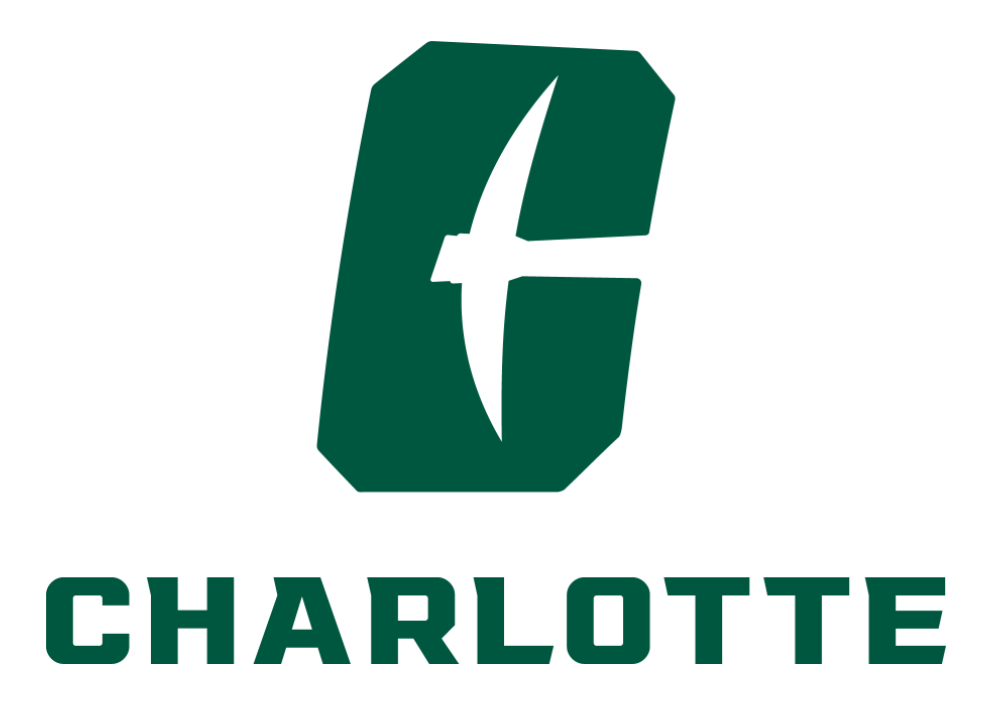

The Charlotte 49ers men's basketball statistical leaders are individual statistical leaders of the Charlotte 49ers men's basketball program in various categories, including points, rebounds, assists, steals, and blocks. Within those areas, the lists identify single-game, single-season, and career leaders. The 49ers represent University of North Carolina at Charlotte in the NCAA Division I American Conference.

Charlotte began competing in intercollegiate basketball in 1965. The NCAA did not officially record assists as a stat until the 1983–84 season, and blocks and steals until the 1985–86 season, but Charlotte's record books includes players in these stats before these seasons. These lists are updated through the end of the 2020–21 season.

== Scoring ==
Career
Rk	Player	Points	Seasons
1	Henry Williams	2383	1988–89 1989–90 1990–91 1991–92
2	Lew Massey	2149	1974–75 1975–76 1976–77 1977–78
3	Jon Davis	2113	2015–16 2016–17 2017–18 2018–19
4	Chad Kinch	2020	1976–77 1977–78 1978–79 1979–80
5	DeMarco Johnson	2005	1994–95 1995–96 1996–97 1997–98
6	Jarvis Lang	1855	1990–91 1992–93 1993–94 1994–95
7	Cedric Maxwell	1824	1973–74 1974–75 1975–76 1976–77
8	Curtis Withers	1750	2002–03 2003–04 2004–05 2005–06
9	Jobey Thomas	1737	1998–99 1999–00 2000–01 2001–02
10	Leemire Goldwire	1677	2004–05 2005–06 2006–07 2007–08

Season
Rk	Player	Points	Season
1	Cedric Maxwell	690	1976–77
2	Lew Massey	677	1975–76
3	Henry Williams	665	1991–92
4	DeMarco Johnson	653	1997–98
5	Leemire Goldwire	634	2007–08
6	Henry Williams	630	1989–90
	Jon Davis	630	2018–19
8	Byron Dinkins	622	1987–88
9	Jahmir Young	608	2021–22
10	George Jackson	590	1974–75

Single game
Rk	Player	Points	Season	Opponent
1	George Jackson	44	1974–75	Samford
2	George Jackson	43	1974–75	Samford
3	Bobby Potts	40	1981–82	Jacksonville
	Robert Earl Blue	40	1972–73	Southern Miss
5	Leemire Goldwire	39	2007–08	St. Bonaventure
	Curtis Withers	39	2004–05	Saint Louis
7	Jon Davis	38	2017–18	Marshall
	Lew Massey	38	1977–78	VCU
9	Jon Davis	37	2018–19	Marshall
	Jon Davis	37	2017–18	FIU
	Byron Dinkins	37	1987–88	UAB
	Cedric Maxwell	37	1976–77	Southern Miss
	Robert Earl Blue	37	1971–72	Tusculum

== Rebounds ==
Career
Rk	Player	Rebounds	Seasons
1	Cedric Maxwell	1117	1973–74 1974–75 1975–76 1976–77
2	Jarvis Lang	1047	1990–91 1992–93 1993–94 1994–95
3	Curtis Withers	1042	2002–03 2003–04 2004–05 2005–06
4	DeMarco Johnson	926	1994–95 1995–96 1996–97 1997–98
5	Chris Braswell	868	2009–10 2010–11 2011–12 2012–13
6	Norris Dae	858	1968–69 1969–70 1970–71 1971–72
7	Ben Basinger	788	1966–67 1967–68 1968–69 1969–70
8	Eddie Basden	765	2001–02 2002–03 2003–04 2004–05
9	Melvin Johnson	740	1980–81 1981–82 1982–83 1983–84
	Lew Massey	740	1974–75 1975–76 1976–77 1977–78

Season
Rk	Player	Rebounds	Season
1	Norris Dae	417	1969–70
2	Joseph Uchebo	380	2015–16
3	Cedric Maxwell	376	1976–77
4	Curtis Withers	362	2005–06
5	Cedric Maxwell	350	1975–76
6	Bob Lemmond	307	1966–67
7	Jarvis Lang	298	1990–91
	Ben Basinger	298	1969–70
9	Jarvis Lang	283	1993–94
10	Anton Bonke	281	2025–26

Single game
Rk	Player	Rebounds	Season	Opponent
1	Cedric Maxwell	24	1976–77	Seton Hall
	Ben Basinger	24	1969–70	Fla. Presbyterian
3	Cedric Ball	22	1989–90	South Florida
4	Joseph Uchebo	21	2015–16	Marshall
	Curtis Withers	21	2005–06	Dayton
	Cedric Maxwell	21	1976–77	Lamar
	Cedric Maxwell	21	1975–76	NC A&T
8	Joseph Uchebo	20	2015–16	LA Tech
	Cedric Maxwell	20	1975–76	Morehead St.
	Cedric Maxwell	20	1974–75	Hardin- Simmons

== Assists ==
Career
Rk	Player	Assists	Seasons
1	Pierria Henry	566	2011–12 2012–13 2013–14 2014–15
2	Jon Davis	547	2015–16 2016–17 2017–18 2018–19
3	Keith Williams	515	1983–84 1984–85 1985–86 1986–87
4	Byron Dinkins	513	1985–86 1986–87 1987–88 1988–89
5	Delano Johnson	496	1989–90 1990–91 1991–92 1993–94
6	DiJuan Harris	474	2007–08 2008–09 2009–10
7	Jeff West	448	1985–86 1986–87 1987–88 1988–89
8	Sean Colson	427	1996–97 1997–98
9	Demon Brown	418	2000–01 2001–02 2002–03 2003–04
10	Phil Ward	407	1978–79 1979–80 1980–81 1981–82

Season
Rk	Player	Assists	Season
1	Sean Colson	231	1997–98
2	DiJuan Harris	223	2008–09
3	Byron Dinkins	207	1988–89
4	Sean Colson	196	1996–97
5	Melvin Watkins	187	1976–77
6	Jeff West	184	1987–88
7	Pierria Henry	175	2013–14
8	Pierria Henry	173	2014–15
9	Randy Davis	170	1982–83
10	Delano Johnson	166	1993–94

Single game
Rk	Player	Assists	Season	Opponent
1	Sean Colson	18	1997–98	Houston
2	Sean Colson	17	1996–97	Houston
3	DiJuan Harris	15	2008–09	Ge. Wash.
	Keith Williams	15	1983–84	UNCW
5	Delano Johnson	14	1993–94	Butler
6	Sean Colson	13	1997–98	Ill.- Chicago
	Sean Colson	13	1997–98	Saint Louis
	Sean Colson	13	1997–98	DePaul
	Sean Colson	13	1997–98	Louisville
	Keith Williams	13	1983–84	South Florida

== Steals ==
Career
Rk	Player	Steals	Seasons
1	Pierria Henry	296	2011–12 2012–13 2013–14 2014–15
2	Eddie Basden	264	2001–02 2002–03 2003–04 2004–05
3	Keith Williams	236	1983–84 1984–85 1985–86 1986–87
4	Phil Ward	221	1978–79 1979–80 1980–81 1981–82
5	Leemire Goldwire	190	2004–05 2005–06 2006–07 2007–08
6	Delano Johnson	189	1989–90 1990–91 1991–92 1993–94
7	Henry Williams	181	1988–89 1989–90 1990–91 1991–92
8	Jeff West	150	1985–86 1986–87 1987–88 1988–89
9	Demon Brown	149	2000–01 2001–02 2002–03 2003–04
	Jarvis Lang	149	1990–91 1992–93 1993–94 1994–95

Season
Rk	Player	Steals	Season
1	Eddie Basden	93	2004–05
2	Pierria Henry	84	2012–13
3	Delano Johnson	77	1990–91
4	Pierria Henry	76	2014–15
5	Pierria Henry	72	2011–12
	Keith Williams	72	1984–85
7	Leemire Goldwire	70	2007–08
8	Eddie Basden	68	2003–04
9	Pierria Henry	64	2013–14
	Kevin King	64	1977–78

Single game
Rk	Player	Steals	Season	Opponent
1	Cedric Ball	10	1988–89	Ga. So.
2	Melvin Watkins	9	1976–77	Baptist College

== Blocks ==
Career
Rk	Player	Blocks	Seasons
1	Ray Gromlowicz	194	1983–84 1984–85 1985–86 1986–87
2	Jermain Parker	177	1992–93 1993–94 1994–95
3	Phil Jones	158	2007–08 2008–09 2009–10 2010–11
4	Jarvis Lang	103	1990–91 1992–93 1993–94 1994–95
5	Chris Braswell	101	2009–10 2010–11 2011–12 2012–13
6	Rodney Odom	94	1991–92 1992–93 1993–94
	Cedric Maxwell	94	1973–74 1974–75 1975–76 1976–77
8	Curtis Withers	89	2002–03 2003–04 2004–05 2005–06
9	Phil Scott	87	1976–77 1977–78 1978–79 1979–80
10	Melvin Johnson	85	1980–81 1981–82 1982–83 1983–84

Season
Rk	Player	Blocks	Season
1	Jermain Parker	94	1994–95
2	Sam Robson	79	1988–89
3	Jermain Parker	76	1993–94
4	Ray Gromlowicz	74	1985–86
5	Ray Gromlowicz	67	1986–87
6	Phil Jones	65	2009–10
7	Cedric Maxwell	55	1976–77
8	Anton Bonke	51	2025–26
9	Martin Iti	48	2004–05
	Alexander Kuehl	48	1996–97

Single game
Rk	Player	Blocks	Season	Opponent
1	Lew Massey	10	1975–76	Wofford
2	Jermain Parker	8	1993–94	Duquesne
	Sam Robson	8	1988–89	South Florida
	Ray Gromlowicz	8	1984–85	Methodist
5	Phil Jones	7	2009–10	Elon
	Sam Robson	7	1988–89	Boston
	Kevin King	7	1978–79	South Alabama
