= List of Charlotte 49ers men's basketball head coaches =

The following is a list of Charlotte 49ers men's basketball head coaches. The 49ers have had 13 coaches in their history. The team is currently coached by Wes Miller.

Tenure	Coach	Years	Record	Pct.
1963–65	Irv Edelman	2	14–6	.700
1965–70	Harvey Murphy	5	44–71	.383
1970–75	Bill Foster	5	88–38	.698
1975–78	Lee Rose	3	72–18	.800
1978–82	Mike Pratt	4	56–52	.519
1982–85	Hal Wissel	3	22–62	.262
1985–96	Jeff Mullins	11	74–72	.507
1996–98	Melvin Watkins	2	42–20	.677
1998–10	Bobby Lutz	12	218–158	.580
2010–15	Alan Major	5	75–81	.481
2015–17	Mark Price	3	30–42	.417
2017–18	Houston Fancher	1	3–18	.166
2018–2023	Ron Sanchez	5	72–78	.480
2023–2026	Aaron Fearne	3	47–51	.480
2026–Present	Wes Miller	1		
Totals	13 coaches	64 seasons	922–789	.539

An asterisk (*) denotes a season currently in progress.
