= Goldwire (surname) =

Goldwire is a surname. Notable people with the surname include:

- Anthony Goldwire (born 1971), American basketball player and coach
- Jordan Goldwire (born 1999), American basketball player
- Leemire Goldwire (born 1985), American basketball player
