= Harvey Murphy =

Harvey Murphy may refer to:

- Harvey Murphy (basketball)
- Harvey Murphy (American football)
