= List of Miami Hurricanes men's basketball head coaches =

The Miami Hurricanes men's basketball represent the University of Miami in the Atlantic Coast Conference in Division I of the NCAA. They have played their home games at the BankUnited Center since 2003. The program's first squad played in 1926. From 1971 through 1985, the men's basketball program was suspended due to lack of adequate funding. The program reached has reached the NCAA Tournament seven times, most recently in 2023.

Overall, there have been 12 head coaches for the Miami Hurricanes, five since the revival of the program in 1985 with Bill Foster. Bruce Hale, who led the Hurricanes to its first NCAA Tournament appearance in 1960, is the school's all-time leader in games coached and wins. Leonard Hamilton was named UPI National Coach of the Year in 1995. Jim Larrañaga is the current coach of the Hurricanes and was named the AP Coach of the Year in 2013.

== Key ==
GC	Games coached
W	Wins
L	Losses
Win%	Winning percentage
#	Number of coaches^{[a]}
*	Spent entire head coaching career with the Miami Hurricanes
†	University of Miami men's basketball program on hiatus from 1971–72 to 1984–85

== Coaches ==
Note: Statistics are correct through March 22, 2026.

#	Name	Term	GC	W	L	Win%	Achievements	Reference
1	Art Webb*	1926–1928, 1930–1931	30	18	12	.600		
2	Tom McCann*	1928–1929, 1931–1932	37	30	7	.811		
3	Hart Morris*	1938–1942, 1946–1952	201	119	82	.592		
4	W.H. Steers*	1945–1946	13	8	5	.615		
5	Dave Wike*	1952–1954	36	14	22	.389		
6	Bruce Hale	1954–1967	332	220	112	.663		
7	Ron Godfrey*	1967–1971	104	47	57	.452		
	None†	1971–1985						
8	Bill Foster	1985–1990	149	78	71	.523		
9	Leonard Hamilton	1990–2000	291	144	147	.495	Big East Coach of the Year (1995, 1999); UPI National Coach of the Year (1995)	
10	Perry Clark	2000–2004	119	65	54	.546		
11	Frank Haith	2004–2011	230	129	101	.561		
12	Jim Larrañaga	2011–2024	448	274	174	.612	ACC Coach of the Year (2013, 2016); AP Coach of the Year (2013)	
13	Bill Courtney	2024–2025 (interim)	19	3	16	.158		
14	Jai Lucas	2025–	35	26	9	.743		

== Notes ==
- ^{a} A running total of the number of coaches of the Hurricanes. Thus, any coach who has two or more separate terms as head coach is only counted once.
