= Melvin Watkins =

American college basketball coach and former player

Biographical details
- Born: November 15, 1954 (age 71); Reidsville, North Carolina, U.S.

Playing career
- 1973–1977: Charlotte

Coaching career (HC unless noted)
- 1978–1987: Charlotte (assistant)
- 1987–1996: Charlotte (associate HC)
- 1996–1998: Charlotte
- 1998–2004: Texas A&M
- 2004–2006: Missouri (associate HC)
- 2006: Missouri (interim HC)
- 2006–2011: Missouri (associate HC)
- 2011–2019: Arkansas (associate HC)

Head coaching record
- Overall: 105–137
- Tournaments: 2–2 (NCAA Division I)

Accomplishments and honors

Awards
- C-USA Coach of the Year (1997); No. 32 retired by Charlotte 49ers

Melvin Lenzo Watkins (born November 15, 1954) is an American former college basketball coach and former player.

== Early years ==
Born in Reidsville, North Carolina, Melvin Watkins attended Reidsville High School. Watkins started for the Reidsville High basketball team for from 1970 to 1973. As a senior, he was named team captain and, after helping the team earn the state championship, was named a 1973 high school All-American.

== Playing career ==
Watkins played college basketball at University of North Carolina at Charlotte, where he was the point guard and team captain of the Charlotte 49ers' 1977 Final Four team. While at Charlotte, Watkins made a point to complete his education, earning a B.A. in Economics in 1977.

Watkins was drafted in the fourth round of the 1977 NBA draft by the Buffalo Braves, but never played in the NBA.

== Coaching career ==
=== Charlotte ===
In 1978, Watkins became an assistant coach for Charlotte's head coach Mike Pratt, and would continue as an assistant with Charlotte through eighteen seasons and three coaches: Pratt, Hal Wissel, and Jeff Mullins. When Mullins retired in 1996, Watkins was promoted and became the seventh head coach in school history and the first Charlotte alumnus to hold the position.

In his first season as head coach Watkins was named the Conference USA Ray Meyer Coach of the Year. He compiled an overall 42–20 record in his two seasons as head coach, bringing the 49ers to the NCAA tournament twice, reaching the second round each year.

=== Texas A&M ===
At the end of the 1998 season, Watkins accepted an offer to become the head coach at Texas A&M University, a school which had enjoyed only one winning season in the previous eight years. During the next six years, Watkins failed to live up to the success he enjoyed at Charlotte, achieving an unimpressive 60–112 record.

In one of the team's more controversial games of Watkins's A&M career, A&M beat Texas Tech 88–86 by sinking a basket at the buzzer. At the time, game officials were not permitted to review plays using instant replay. The game was declared over, although Texas Tech administrators continued to plead with officials to return to the court and review the play. Watkins shepherded his team out of the locker room and onto the team bus without allowing them time to change, citing security concerns. Watkins conducted the post-game news conference with a cell phone from the team bus. The NCAA soon changed its rules to allow game officials to use instant replay for reviews. The lead official was later suspended, not for missing the call, but for failing to follow procedure for returning to the court after declaring the game was over.

The low point came in 2003–04, when the Aggies put up a 7–22 record, going 0–16 in the Big 12 Conference. Watkins was pressured into resigning during the Big 12 Tournament in 2004. Watkins would not coach for a team that beat Texas A&M again until 2013, when Arkansas snapped his personal 26-game losing streak in games where Texas A&M was playing and he was coaching. He attributed much of the team's poor showing to the youth of the team's very talented recruits, which included freshman Acie Law IV and sophomores Marlon Pompey and Antoine Wright, and under his replacement Billy Gillispie, Watkins's players developed into a very strong team, earning an 8–8 conference record and a trip to the NIT in 2004–2005.

During his tenure at Texas A&M, Watkins was noted for his outstanding recruiting, bringing eight National Top 100 recruits to the campus, including Antoine Wright the school's tenth all-time leading scorer, and future first-team All-American Acie Law IV. He also placed a heavy emphasis on academics, turning out 15 Academic All-Big 12 first or second-team members during his six years, and ensuring that fourteen of the seventeen players who completed their eligibility at A&M went on to graduate (the remaining three players are playing professional basketball in overseas leagues).

=== Missouri ===
After tendering his resignation at Texas A&M, Watkins accepted the job as associate head coach at the University of Missouri on June 21, 2004.

Watkins was named interim head coach at Mizzou following Quin Snyder's firing on February 10, 2006, with the Tigers at a record of 10–11 and suffering from a six-game losing streak. Watkins led the team to a 2–4 record during the remainder of their conference play. Following the hiring of new head coach Mike Anderson, Watkins resumed his title of associate head coach.

=== Arkansas ===
On April 6, 2011, Watkins and other fellow assistants followed Anderson to the University of Arkansas, where Anderson had become head coach. After eight seasons, Watkins was dismissed, along with the rest of the Arkansas staff at the conclusion of the 2019 season.

== Personal life ==
Watkins is married to the former Burrell Bryant. They have three children, Manuale, Marcus, and Keia. Marcus played for his father at both Texas A&M and the University of Missouri.

Watkins is active in Habitat for Humanity and has served as the co-chair of a battered women's shelter.

== Head coaching record ==
Record table
Season	Team	Overall	Conference	Standing	Postseason
Charlotte 49ers (Conference USA) (1996–1998)
1996–97	Charlotte	22–9	10–4	1st (White)	NCAA Division I second round
1997–98	Charlotte	20–11	13–3	2nd (American)	NCAA Division I second round
Charlotte:		42–20 (.677)	23–7 (.767)		
Texas A&M Aggies (Big 12 Conference) (1998–2004)
1998–99	Texas A&M	12–15	5–11	T–10th	
1999–00	Texas A&M	8–20	4–12	T–8th	
2000–01	Texas A&M	10–20	3–13	T–11th	
2001–02	Texas A&M	10–22	3–13	T–10th	
2002–03	Texas A&M	14–14	6–10	T–7th	
2003–04	Texas A&M	7–21	0–16	12th	
Texas A&M:		61–112 (.353)	21–75 (.219)		
Missouri Tigers (Big 12 Conference) (2006)
2005–06	Missouri	2–5*	2–4*	11th	
Missouri:		2–5 (.286)	2–4 (.333)		
Total:		105–137 (.434)			
National champion Postseason invitational champion Conference regular season champion Conference regular season and conference tournament champion Division regular season champion Division regular season and conference tournament champion Conference tournament champion

*Interim coach after Quin Snyder resigned; complete record for the 2005–06 season was 12–16 (5–11 Big 12).
