= Jon Davis (basketball) =

American basketball player (born 1996)

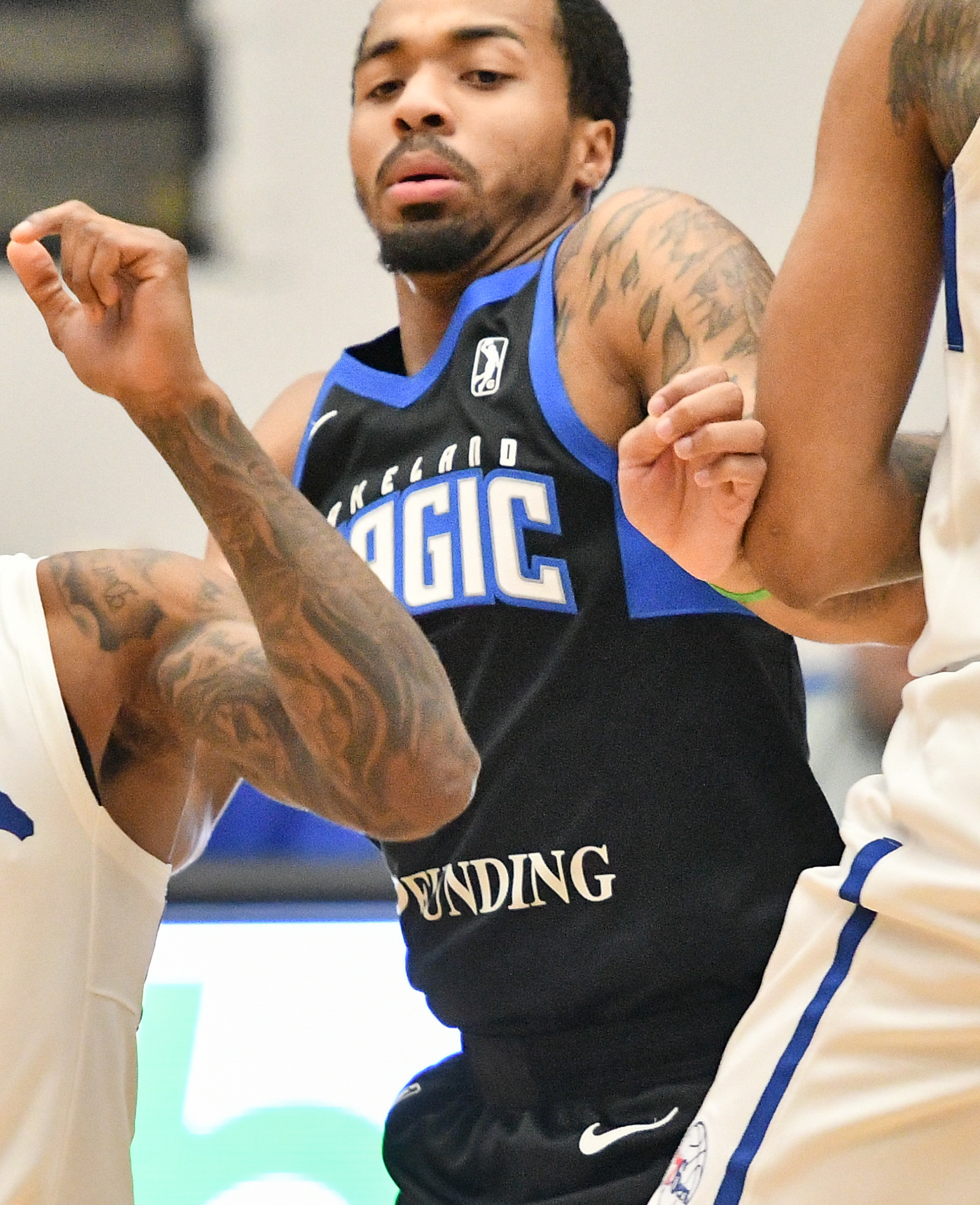
- Davis with Lakeland Magic in 2019

No. 3 – Rilski Sportist
- Position: Point guard
- League: NBL Bulgaria

Personal information
- Born: November 8, 1996 (age 30) Upper Marlboro, Maryland, U.S.
- Listed height: 6 ft 2 in (1.88 m)
- Listed weight: 200 lb (91 kg)

Career information
- High school: Hargrave Military Academy (Chatham, Virginia)
- College: Charlotte (2015–2019)
- NBA draft: 2019: undrafted
- Playing career: 2019–present

Career history
- 2019–2020: Lakeland Magic
- 2020–2021: Borac Banja Luka
- 2021: KK EuroNickel 2005
- 2021–2022: Bosna
- 2022: Tijuana Zonkeys
- 2022–2023: Mladost Zemun
- 2023: Juventus Utena
- 2023: BC Šiauliai
- 2023–2024: Hapoel Haifa
- 2024: Hapoel Gilboa Galil
- 2024-2025: Hapoel Haifa
- 2026-present: Rilski Sportist

Career highlights
- 2x Second-team All-Conference USA (2017, 2019)
- Stats at Basketball Reference

Jonathan Renard Davis (born November 8, 1996) is an American professional basketball player for Hapoel Haifa of the Israeli Basketball Premier League. He played college basketball for the Charlotte 49ers of Conference USA. He plays the point guard position.

== College career ==
As a sophomore, he was named to the Second Team All-Conference USA. He averaged 19.6 points per game, second best in the conference, and 4.2 assists per game, sixth in the conference. He shot 48.2 percent on field goals and 38.0 percent for 3-pointers. He had a career-high 38 points in a 91–83 loss to Marshall on January 11, 2018. Davis averaged 17.6 points and 5.5 assists per game as a junior, but Charlotte went 6–23. At the end of the season Davis declared for the 2018 NBA draft but did not hire an agent to retain his collegiate eligibility.

On February 16, 2019, Davis scored his 2,000th career point in a loss to Old Dominion. He averaged 21.7 points (2nd in the conference), 4.5 rebounds and 3.7 assists per game as a senior and was named to the second-team All-Conference USA.

== Professional career ==
Davis was signed to an Exhibit 10 deal by the Orlando Magic on October 12, 2019. Davis was assigned to the Magic's G League affiliate, the Lakeland Magic. On January 25, 2020, Davis scored a season-high 30 points in a 130–117 win over the Greensboro Swarm. He averaged 6.4 points, 2.4 rebounds and 1.7 assists per game.

On November 2, 2020, Davis signed with Borac Banja Luka of the Championship of Bosnia and Herzegovina. He averaged 10.9 points, 2.8 assists, and 2.3 rebounds per game in the Bosnian league.

On September 20, 2021, Davis signed with KK EuroNickel 2005 of the Macedonian First League, with whom he played five games.

In 2021-22 he played with KK Bosna. He averaged 23.6 points (leading the league) and 5.3 assists (6th) per game, and shot .838 from the free throw line.

In 2022-23 he played for KK Mladost Zemun. He averaged 19.4 points (4th in the league) and 4.0 assists per game, while shooting .843 from the free throw line.

On March 22, 2023, Davis signed with Juventus Utena of the Lithuanian Basketball League (LKL). He averaged 15.9 points, 2.8 rebounds and 3.9 assists per game, shooting 55.7 percent from the field.

On August 12, 2023, Davis signed a one-year deal with Lietkabelis Panevėžys of the Lithuanian Basketball League (LKL) and the EuroCup. On September 13, he was waived after appearing in six preseason games.

On September 19, 2023, Davis signed a two-month contract with BC Šiauliai of the Lithuanian Basketball League (LKL), with whom he played eight games, averaging 11.9 points per game.

In 2023, Davis signed with Hapoel Haifa of the Israeli Basketball Premier League.
