= 1988 Sun Belt Conference men's basketball tournament =

- Classification: Division I
- Season: 1987–88
- Teams: 8
- Site: Richmond Coliseum; Richmond, VA
- Champions: UNC Charlotte (2nd title)
- Winning coach: Jeff Mullins (2nd title)
- MVP: Byron Dinkins (UNC Charlotte)

1987–88 Sun Belt Conference men's basketball standings
	Conf.				Overall
Team	W		L	PCT	W		L	PCT
UNC Charlotte †	11	–	3	.786	22	–	9	.710
VCU	10	–	4	.714	23	–	12	.657
Old Dominion	9	–	5	.643	18	–	12	.600
South Alabama	8	–	6	.571	15	–	14	.517
UAB	7	–	7	.500	16	–	15	.516
Western Kentucky	6	–	8	.429	15	–	13	.536
South Florida	3	–	11	.214	6	–	22	.214
Jacksonville	2	–	12	.143	8	–	21	.276
† 1988 Sun Belt Tournament winner Rankings from AP Poll

The 1988 Sun Belt Conference men's basketball tournament was held March 5–7 at the Richmond Coliseum in Richmond, Virginia.

Top-seeded UNC Charlotte defeated hosts VCU in the championship game, 81–79, to win their second Sun Belt men's basketball tournament.

The 49ers, in turn, received an automatic bid to the 1988 NCAA tournament. No other Sun Belt members received at-large bids to the tournament.

== Format ==
There were no changes to the existing tournament format. All eight conference members were placed into the initial quarterfinal round and each team was seeded based on its regular season conference record.

== Bracket ==
Quarterfinals; Saturday, March 5
1	UNC Charlotte	73
8	Jacksonville	72
5	UAB	73
4	South Alabama	78
3	Old Dominion	86
6	Western Kentucky	84
7	South Florida	60
2	VCU	82

Semifinals; Sunday, March 6
1	UNC Charlotte	71
4	South Alabama	67
3	Old Dominion	69
2	VCU	91

Championship; Monday, March 7
1	UNC Charlotte	81
2	VCU	79

== See also ==
- Sun Belt Conference women's basketball tournament
