= 1987–88 UNC Charlotte 49ers men's basketball team =

American college basketball season

1987–88 UNC Charlotte 49ers men's basketball
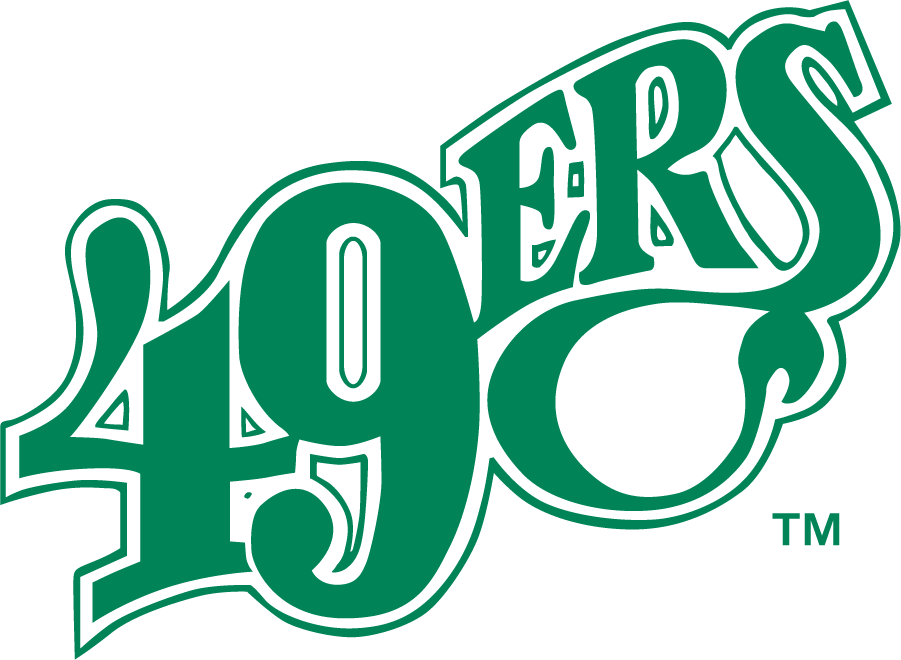

Sun Belt Regular Season champion Sun Belt Tournament champion

NCAA tournament
- Conference: Sun Belt Conference
- Record: 22–9 (11–3 Sun Belt)
- Head coach: Jeff Mullins (3rd season)
- Home arena: Charlotte Coliseum; Belk Gymnasium (alternate)

1987–88 Sun Belt Conference men's basketball standings
	Conf.				Overall
Team	W		L	PCT	W		L	PCT
UNC Charlotte †	11	–	3	.786	22	–	9	.710
VCU	10	–	4	.714	23	–	12	.657
Old Dominion	9	–	5	.643	18	–	12	.600
South Alabama	8	–	6	.571	15	–	14	.517
UAB	7	–	7	.500	16	–	15	.516
Western Kentucky	6	–	8	.429	15	–	13	.536
South Florida	3	–	11	.214	6	–	22	.214
Jacksonville	2	–	12	.143	8	–	21	.276
† 1988 Sun Belt Tournament winner Rankings from AP Poll

The 1987–88 UNC Charlotte 49ers men's basketball team represented the University of North Carolina at Charlotte in the 1987–88 college basketball season. This was head coach Jeff Mullins's third season at Charlotte. The 49ers competed in the Sun Belt Conference and played their home games at Dale F. Halton Arena. They finished the season 22–9 (11–3 in Sun Belt play) and won the Sun Belt Conference tournament to receive an automatic bid to the 1988 NCAA tournament. The 49ers lost in the opening round to BYU, 98–92 in OT.

== Roster ==
1987–88 UNC Charlotte 49ers men's basketball team
Players
Coaches

Pos.	#	Name	Height	Weight	Year	Hometown
G	4	Byron Dinkins	6 ft 1 in (1.85 m)	165 lb (75 kg)	Jr	Charlotte, North Carolina
F	44	Cedric Ball	6 ft 8 in (2.03 m)	205 lb (93 kg)	Fr	Worcester, Massachusetts

Head coach

- Jeff Mullins

Assistant coach(es)

Legend

- (C) Team captain
- (S) Suspended
- (I) Ineligible
- (W) Walk-on
- Injured
- Current redshirt

== Schedule and results ==
Date time, TV	Rank^{#}	Opponent^{#}	Result	Record	Site city, state
Regular season
Nov 27, 1987*		Longwood	W 77–51	1–0	Charlotte Coliseum; Charlotte, North Carolina
Dec 3, 1987*		Coastal Carolina	W 89–73	2–0	Charlotte Coliseum; Charlotte, North Carolina
Dec 7, 1987*		Georgia Southern	W 65–57	3–0	Charlotte Coliseum; Charlotte, North Carolina
Dec 9, 1987*		at Georgia State	W 89–70	4–0	GSU Sports Arena; Atlanta, Georgia
Dec 12, 1987*		Davidson	W 86–68	5–0	Charlotte Coliseum; Charlotte, North Carolina
Dec 18, 1987*		vs. Middle Tennessee; UK Invitational Tournament	W 89–73	6–0	Rupp Arena; Lexington, Kentucky
Dec 19, 1987*		at No. 1 Kentucky; UK Invitational Tournament	L 81–84	6–1	Rupp Arena; Lexington, Kentucky
Dec 28, 1987*		vs. Howard; WLKF Classic	W 89–73	7–1	George W. Jenkins Field House; Lakeland, Florida
Dec 29, 1987*		at Florida Southern; WLKF Classic	L 64–82	7–2	George W. Jenkins Field House; Lakeland, Florida
Jan 2, 1988		at Jacksonville	W 90–77	8–2 (1–0)	Jacksonville Coliseum; Jacksonville, Florida
Jan 6, 1988*		Bradley	L 82–98	8–3	Charlotte Coliseum (10,012); Charlotte, North Carolina
Jan 9, 1988		South Alabama	W 87–80	9–3 (2–0)	Charlotte Coliseum; Charlotte, North Carolina
Jan 12, 1988*		at West Virginia	L 52–78	9–4	WVU Coliseum; Morgantown, West Virginia
Jan 16, 1988		Jacksonville	W 68–65	10–4 (3–0)	Charlotte Coliseum; Charlotte, North Carolina
Jan 21, 1988*		at Virginia Tech	L 60–81	10–5	Cassell Coliseum; Blacksburg, Virginia
Jan 25, 1988		at Western Kentucky	L 69–78	10–6 (3–1)	E. A. Diddle Arena; Bowling Green, Kentucky
Jan 28, 1988		Old Dominion	W 81–65	11–6 (4–1)	Charlotte Coliseum; Charlotte, North Carolina
Jan 30, 1988		at South Florida	W 67–58	12–6 (5–1)	Yuengling Center; Tampa, Florida
Feb 1, 1988*		UNC Wilmington	W 85–75	13–6	Charlotte Coliseum; Charlotte, North Carolina
Feb 4, 1988		Western Kentucky	W 90–74	14–6 (6–1)	Charlotte Coliseum; Charlotte, North Carolina
Feb 7, 1988		at South Alabama	W 89–84	15–6 (7–1)	Jaguar Gym; Mobile, Alabama
Feb 11, 1988		at Alabama-Birmingham	W 86–79	16–6 (8–1)	BJCC Coliseum; Birmingham, Alabama
Feb 13, 1988		at Old Dominion	W 82–81	17–6 (9–1)	Norfolk Scope; Norfolk, Virginia
Feb 15, 1988		VCU	L 83–91	17–7 (9–2)	Charlotte Coliseum; Charlotte, North Carolina
Feb 20, 1988		South Florida	W 84–72	18–7 (10–2)	Charlotte Coliseum; Charlotte, North Carolina
Feb 25, 1988		UAB	W 80–78	19–7 (11–2)	Charlotte Coliseum; Charlotte, North Carolina
Feb 27, 1988		at VCU	L 65–84	19–8 (11–3)	Richmond Coliseum; Richmond, Virginia
Sun Belt tournament
Mar 5, 1988*		vs. Jacksonville; Quarterfinals	W 73–72	20–8	Richmond Coliseum; Richmond, Virginia
Mar 6, 1988*		vs. South Alabama; Semifinals	W 71–67	21–8	Richmond Coliseum; Richmond, Virginia
Mar 7, 1988*		at VCU; Championship game	W 81–79	22–8	Richmond Coliseum; Richmond, Virginia
NCAA tournament
Mar 17, 1988*	(13 SE)	vs. (4 SE) No. 19 BYU; First Round	L 92–98 ^{OT}	22–9	The Omni; Atlanta, Georgia
*Non-conference game. ^{#}Rankings from AP Poll. (#) Tournament seedings in parentheses.
