= Sean Colson =

American basketball player (born 1975)

Personal information
- Born: July 1, 1975 (age 51) Philadelphia, Pennsylvania, U.S.
- Listed height: 6 ft 0 in (1.83 m)
- Listed weight: 175 lb (79 kg)

Career information
- High school: Maine Central Institute (Pittsfield, Maine)
- College: Rhode Island (1994–1995); Hagerstown CC (1995–1996); Charlotte (1996–1998)
- NBA draft: 1998: undrafted
- Playing career: 1998–2010
- Position: Point guard
- Number: 2, 20

Career history
- 1998–1999: Grand Rapids Hoops
- 1999: Pennsylvania ValleyDawgs
- 1999–2000: Grand Rapids Hoops
- 2000: Dodge City Legend
- 2000: Trotamundos de Carabobo
- 2000–2001: Grand Rapids Hoops
- 2001: Atlanta Hawks
- 2001: Houston Rockets
- 2001–2002: Grand Rapids Hoops
- 2002: Euro Roseto
- 2002: Mobile Revelers
- 2003: Śląsk Wrocław
- 2003: Dynamo Moscow Region
- 2003–2004: Cimberio Novara
- 2004: Kyiv
- 2004–2006: Pepsi Caserta
- 2006–2007: Cimberio Novara
- 2007: Besançon BCD
- 2007: Ironi Nahariya
- 2007–2008: Hyères-Toulon
- 2008: Erdemirspor
- 2009: ASK Riga
- 2009–2010: Antranik Beirut
- 2010: Al Arabi
- 2010: Toros de Aragua

Career highlights
- French League Best Scorer (2008); All-CBA First Team (2002); CBA scoring champion (2002); CBA assists leader (2002); First-team All-Conference USA (1998)
- Stats at NBA.com
- Stats at Basketball Reference

Sean Tyree Colson (born July 1, 1975) is an American former professional basketball player who played briefly in the National Basketball Association (NBA). He was born in Philadelphia, Pennsylvania. At a height of 6 ft 0 in (1.83 m) tall, he played at the point guard position.

== College career ==
Colson attended the University of Rhode Island, the University of North Carolina at Charlotte, and Hagerstown Junior College.

== Professional playing career ==
Colson split the 2000–01 National Basketball Association season with the Atlanta Hawks and Houston Rockets.

Colson also played with the Dodge City Legend of the USBL, the Grand Rapids Hoops of the CBA and in Italy, France, Turkey, Poland, Ukraine, Latvia, Lebanon, Kuwait, and Venezuela.

He was selected to the All-CBA First Team while playing in the CBA for the Grand Rapids Hoops during the 2001–02 season.

== Coaching career ==
Colson is currently head basketball coach at Martin Luther King High School, in Philadelphia.
