= Jobey Thomas =

American retired basketball player (born 1980)

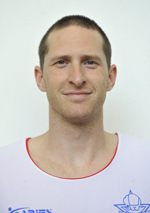
- Thomas with Pallacanestro Varese

Personal information
- Born: March 24, 1980 (age 46) Charlotte, North Carolina, U.S.
- Listed height: 6 ft 4 in (1.93 m)
- Listed weight: 198 lb (90 kg)

Career information
- High school: Independence (Charlotte, North Carolina)
- College: Charlotte (1998–2002)
- NBA draft: 2002: undrafted
- Playing career: 2002–2015
- Position: Shooting guard

Career history
- 2002–2003: Queluz
- 2003–2004: Andrea Costa Imola
- 2004–2006: Basket Club Ferrara
- 2006–2008: Sutor Basket
- 2008–2009: Olimpia Milano
- 2009–2011: Pallacanestro Varese
- 2011–2012: Treviso Basket
- 2012–2013: Pallacanestro Trieste
- 2013: Basket Barcellona
- 2013–2015: Benfica

Career highlights
- First-team All-Conference USA (2002)

Jobey Wayne Thomas (born March 24, 1980) is an American retired basketball player who competed for a number of professional clubs, mostly in Italy, with a short but successful spell in Portuguese basketball.

In his college basketball career, Thomas holds the Charlotte 49ers record for three-pointers made and games played.

== Career ==
Born in Charlotte, North Carolina, Thomas played basketball at Independence High School. He helped lead Independence to the 1997 North Carolina 4A state championship as a junior and was named the tournament's Most Valuable Player.

One of the nations top guard recruits, he signed to play college basketball for the Charlotte 49ers in Division I NCAA, under Bobby Lutz. He ended his college career for Charlotte with then records for three-pointers made, games, consecutive games (130) and starts and single-season record for three-pointers (110), plus Conference USA records for career three-pointers made, single-season three-pointers made and single-season three-pointers in league games (60), while averaging 13.4 points per game. He took part in ESPN's Three-Point Shooting Contest on 24 March 2002, and on the 2002 NBA Pre-Draft summer camp in Chicago.

After not being drafted, he moved to Europe and joined Queluz in the Portuguese Basketball League, playing only 18 games with an average of 24 points per game.

He soon joined the Serie A in Italy, and in a five-year period, Thomas average more than 17 points per game in 163 games, representing three different teams. After arriving at Olimpia Milano in 2008, he made his debut in European competitions, playing the 2008–09 Euroleague, averaging 12.1 points per game, helping Milano reach the Top 16 stage.

He continued his globetrotter career and moved clubs again, first at Pallacanestro Varese and then at Treviso Basket, where he returned to European basket, playing the 2011–12 Eurocup and reaching the Top 16 with the Venetian team.

After two more short stints in more Italy, Thomas returned to Portugal in August 2013, to play for Benfica, adding nine titles in two seasons, and competing in the 2014–15 EuroChallenge. On 1 June 2015, the 35-year-old announced his retirement from basketball.

== Honors ==
Benfica

- Portuguese League: 2013–14, 2014–15
- Portuguese Cup: 2013–14, 2014–15
- League Cup / Hugo dos Santos Cup: 2013–14, 2014–15
- Portuguese Supercup: 2013, 2014
- António Pratas Trophy: 2014
