= DeMarco Johnson =

American basketball player (born 1975)

Personal information
- Born: October 6, 1975 (age 51) Charlotte, North Carolina, U.S.
- Listed height: 6 ft 9 in (2.06 m)
- Listed weight: 245 lb (111 kg)

Career information
- High school: North Mecklenburg (Huntersville, North Carolina)
- College: Charlotte (1994–1998)
- NBA draft: 1998: 2nd round, 38th overall pick
- Drafted by: New York Knicks
- Playing career: 1998–2010
- Position: Power forward
- Number: 4
- Coaching career: 2010–present

Career history

Playing
- 1998–1999: Sony Milano
- 1999: New York Knicks
- 1999–2000: Richmond Rhythm
- 2000–2001: Scavolini Pesaro
- 2001: Metis Varese
- 2002–2003: Olympiacos
- 2003–2004: Etosa Alicante
- 2004: Lauretana Biella
- 2004–2005: Tris Rieti
- 2005–2006: Union Olimpija Ljubljana
- 2006: Panteras del Distrito Nacional
- 2006–2007: Polaris World Murcia
- 2007: Elitzur Ashkelon
- 2007–2008: Geoplin Slovan
- 2009: Maccabi Rishon LeZion
- 2009–2010: Ironi Nahariya
- 2009–2010: Vaqueros de Bayamón

Coaching
- 2010–2011: Providence Day School
- 2011–2016: Hampton (assistant)

Career highlights
- Slovenian Basketball Cup champion (2006); Conference USA Player of the Year (1998); 2× First-team All-Conference USA (1997, 1998); Second-team All-Conference USA (1996); Metro Conference All-Freshman team (1995); No. 4 retired by Charlotte 49ers
- Stats at NBA.com
- Stats at Basketball Reference

DeMarco Antonio Johnson (born October 6, 1975) is an American retired professional basketball player and former assistant basketball coach at Hampton University.

== Early life ==
Johnson graduated from North Mecklenburg High School in 1993. He was an all-county selection as a senior.

== College career ==
Johnson attended and played collegiately for the University of North Carolina at Charlotte. He redshirted his freshman year before lettering in basketball for four years and was selected in the All-Freshman team of the Metro Conference. As a sophomore, he was a second-team All-Conference USA selection and then a two-time first-team All-C-USA selection. C-USA also named Johnson player of the year in 1998. He graduated with a bachelor's degree in criminal justice. With Johnson, Charlotte appeared in the NCAA post-season tournament in 1995, 1997, and 1998 and was the top regular season Conference USA team in 1995 and 1997.

== Professional career ==
In the 1998 NBA draft, he was selected by the New York Knicks with the 9th pick of the 2nd round (38th overall). In his brief NBA career he played in five games for the Knicks in the 1999–2000 season, registering 6 points and 7 rebounds.

Overseas, Johnson played professionally in Italy with Sony Milano (1998–1999), Scavolini Pesaro (2000–2001, 2002), Metis Varese (2001–2002), Lauretana Biella (2004) and Sebastiani Rieti (Serie A2, 2004–2005), in Spain with Etosa Alicante, and in Greece with Olympiacos.

In January 2006, Johnson signed with KK Union Olimpija of Slovenia. In April 2007 he moved to the Israeli league and signed with Elitzur Ashkelon, where he played until the end of the season. In January 2009 he signed with Maccabi Rishon LeZion in the Israeli league. He played in the Israeli team Ironi Nahariya the next season and was waived in January 2010.

== Coaching career ==
In 2010, Johnson became head coach of the basketball team of Providence Day School in Charlotte. The team won 18 games and made the quarterfinals for the first time since 2007. Johnson became an assistant coach at Hampton University the following year. He left the Hampton Pirates after the 2015–16 season.
