= Houston Fancher =

American basketball coach (born 1966)

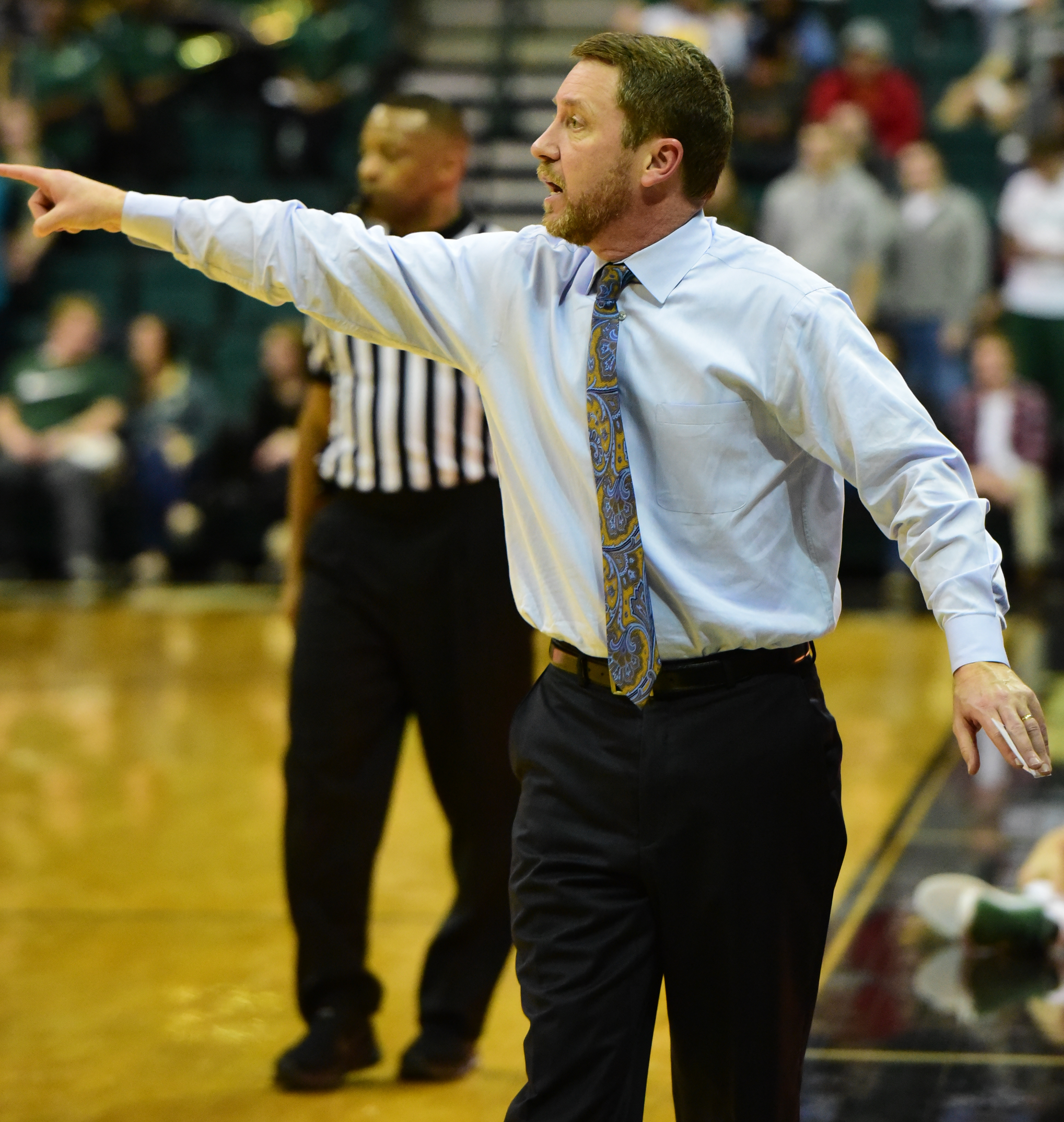

Current position
- Title: Assistant Coach / Director of Operations
- Team: NC State
- Conference: ACC

Biographical details
- Born: February 17, 1966 (age 60); Newport, Tennessee, U.S.

Playing career
- 1985–1988: Middle Tennessee

Coaching career (HC unless noted)
- 1988–1992: Maryville (assistant)
- 1992–1995: North Greenville
- 1995–1996: Vanderbilt (asst.)
- 1996–2000: Appalachian State (asst.)
- 2000–2009: Appalachian State
- 2009–2013: Tennessee (asst.)
- 2013–2014: UNC Wilmington (asst.)
- 2015–2017: Charlotte (asst.)
- 2017–2018: Charlotte (Interim HC)

Administrative career (AD unless noted)
- 2018–present: NC State (women's) (dir. of op. & pl. de.)

Head coaching record
- Overall: 184–177 (.510)

Accomplishments and honors

Championships
- 3× SoCon regular season champion (2003, 2007, 2008)

Awards
- SoCon Coach of the Year (2003)

Houston Fancher (born February 17, 1966) is an American basketball coach, previously the interim head coach of the Charlotte 49ers men's basketball team. Prior to that, he worked for a summer in Oak Ridge, Tennessee. Later, he also worked for four years at the University of Tennessee, including as the Director of Basketball Operations for the last two of those years. From 2000 to 2009, he was the men's head basketball coach of the Mountaineers at Appalachian State University. His first two seasons saw his team go 11–20, and 10–18, respectively. The following season, 2002–03, his team went 19–10, and Fancher was named the Southern Conference Coach of the Year. In the 2006–07 season, his squad won a school record 25 games, but failed to make the NCAA tournament, instead garnering Appalachian's first National Invitation Tournament (NIT) berth instead. On March 16, 2009, Fancher resigned as head coach following a disappointing 2008–09 season.

On April 2, 2015, Fancher was named assistant coach on the staff of new Charlotte 49ers head coach Mark Price. He was elevated to interim head coach after Price's sudden firing on December 14, 2017.

On March 6, 2018, following a 3–17 record, Fancher was notified by incoming athletics director Mike Hill that he would not be retained through the 2018–19 season and that a nationwide search for a permanent men's basketball coach would begin immediately.

== Head coaching record ==
Record table
| Season | Team | Overall | Conference | Standing | Postseason |
|---|---|---|---|---|---|
North Greenville Crusaders (Division II Independent) (1992–1995)
| 1992–93 | North Greenville | 14–14 | | | |
| 1993–94 | North Greenville | 15–13 | | | |
| 1994–95 | North Greenville | 15–14 | | | |
| North Greenville: | | 44–41 (.518) | | | |
Appalachian State Mountaineers (Southern Conference) (2000–2009)
| 2000–01 | Appalachian State | 11–20 | 7–9 | T–3rd (North) | |
| 2001–02 | Appalachian State | 10–18 | 5–11 | T–3rd (North) | |
| 2002–03 | Appalachian State | 19–10 | 11–5 | T–1st (North) | |
| 2003–04 | Appalachian State | 9–21 | 4–12 | 6th (North) | |
| 2004–05 | Appalachian State | 18–12 | 9–7 | T–2nd (North) | |
| 2005–06 | Appalachian State | 14–16 | 6–8 | 4th (North) | |
| 2006–07 | Appalachian State | 25–8 | 15–3 | 1st (North) | NIT First Round |
| 2007–08 | Appalachian State | 18–13 | 13–7 | T–1st (North) | |
| 2008–09 | Appalachian State | 13–18 | 9–11 | T–2nd (North) | |
| Appalachian State: | | 137–136 (.502) | 79–73 (.520) | | |
Charlotte 49ers (Conference USA) (2017–2018)
| 2017–18 | Charlotte | 3–17 (Note: Interim head coach, taking over for Mark Price who was fired on December 14, 2017.) | 2–16 | 14th | |
| Charlotte: | | 3–17 (.150) | 2–16 (.111) | | |
| Total: | | 184–194 (.487) | | | |
National champion Postseason invitational champion Conference regular season champion Conference regular season and conference tournament champion Division regular season champion Division regular season and conference tournament champion Conference tournament champion
