= Anthony Goldwire =

American basketball player (born 1971)

Personal information
- Born: September 6, 1971 (age 55) West Palm Beach, Florida, U.S.
- Listed height: 6 ft 1 in (1.85 m)
- Listed weight: 182 lb (83 kg)

Career information
- High school: Suncoast (Riviera Beach, Florida)
- College: Pensacola State (1990–1992); Houston (1992–1994)
- NBA draft: 1994: 2nd round, 52nd overall pick
- Drafted by: Phoenix Suns
- Playing career: 1994–2008
- Position: Point guard
- Number: 5, 15, 9, 7, 4
- Coaching career: 2010–present

Career history

Playing
- 1994–1996: Yakima Sun Kings
- 1996–1997: Charlotte Hornets
- 1997–1998: Denver Nuggets
- 1998–1999: Olympiacos
- 1999–2000: FC Barcelona
- 2000–2001: Kansas City Knights
- 2001: Denver Nuggets
- 2001–2002: Skipper Bologna
- 2002: San Antonio Spurs
- 2002–2003: Yakima Sun Kings
- 2003: Washington Wizards
- 2003: Gigantes de Carolina
- 2003–2004: Yakima Sun Kings
- 2004: Minnesota Timberwolves
- 2004: Aris
- 2004: New Jersey Nets
- 2004: Criollos de Caguas
- 2004: Milwaukee Bucks
- 2005: Detroit Pistons
- 2005: Milwaukee Bucks
- 2005: Los Angeles Clippers
- 2005–2006: Yakama Sun Kings
- 2006: Pamesa Valencia
- 2006–2007: Panellinios
- 2007: Lokomotiv-Kuban
- 2007–2008: Aigaleo

Coaching
- 2010–2013: Milwaukee Bucks (assistant)
- 2014–2016: Erie BayHawks (assistant)

Career highlights
- Greek Cup winner (2004); Greek League All-Star (1998); 3× CBA champion (1995, 2003, 2006); CBA Most Valuable Player (2006); CBA Finals MVP (2006); CBA All-Star (2004); 3× All-CBA First Team (1996, 2004, 2006); CBA All-Rookie Second Team (1995); Catalan Basketball League champion (2000); 2× Second-team All-SWC (1993, 1994)
- Stats at NBA.com
- Stats at Basketball Reference

Anthony Goldwire (born September 6, 1971) is an American former professional basketball player and coach. He played in the NBA, and other leagues. Born in West Palm Beach, Florida, he played college basketball for the University of Houston, and was drafted by the Phoenix Suns in the 2nd round (52nd overall), of the 1994 NBA draft.

== Professional career ==
Goldwire began his career with the Yakima Sun Kings of the Continental Basketball Association (CBA) during the 1994–95 season and earned All-Rookie Second Team honors. He was named to the All CBA First Team with the Sun Kings in the 1995–96 season.

Goldwire returned to the Sun Kings in the 2002–03 season. He was named to the All-CBA First Team in 2004. Goldwire led the Sun Kings to a CBA championship in 2006 as he was named Finals Most Valuable Player, league Most Valuable Player and a member of the All-CBA First Team.

Goldwire played with Panellinios of the Greek Basket League in the 2006–07 season. In 2009, he joined the Spanish club CB Girona.

== NBA career statistics ==
Legend
GP	Games played	GS	Games started	MPG	Minutes per game
FG%	Field goal percentage	3P%	3-point field goal percentage	FT%	Free throw percentage
RPG	Rebounds per game	APG	Assists per game	SPG	Steals per game
BPG	Blocks per game	PPG	Points per game	**Bold**	Career high
*	Led the league

=== Regular season ===
Year	Team	GP	GS	MPG	FG%	3P%	FT%	RPG	APG	SPG	BPG	PPG
1995–96	Charlotte	42	8	14.8	.402	.398	.767	1.0	2.7	0.4	0.0	5.5
1996–97	Charlotte	33	9	17.5	.403	.439	.750	1.2	2.8	0.6	0.0	5.8
1996–97	Denver	27	21	22.7	.392	.394	.816	1.7	**4.6**	0.5	0.0	7.3
1997–98	Denver	**82***	**32**	**27.0**	.423	.384	.806	1.8	3.4	**1.0**	**0.1**	**9.2**
2000–01	Denver	20	0	10.1	.375	.265	.765	0.6	1.7	0.5	0.0	4.1
2002–03	San Antonio	10	0	5.1	.278	.250	.000	0.3	0.3	0.3	0.0	1.2
2002–03	Washington	5	0	6.8	**.571**	**1.000**	.800	0.6	0.2	0.0	0.0	2.6
2003–04	Minnesota	5	0	13.2	.357	.333	**1.000**	1.2	2.0	0.6	0.0	2.6
2003–04	New Jersey	6	0	3.2	.250	.000	.000	0.2	0.2	0.3	0.0	0.7
2004–05	Detroit	9	0	6.1	.267	.333	.875	0.9	0.0	0.0	0.0	2.0
2004–05	Milwaukee	24	2	20.1	.438	.408	.826	**2.1**	3.3	0.6	0.0	6.4
2005–06	Los Angeles	3	0	7.3	.143	.000	.000	0.3	0.7	0.0	0.0	0.7
Career		266	72	18.6	.407	.386	.792	1.3	2.8	0.6	0.0	6.3

== Coaching career ==
In July 2010, Goldwire joined the Phoenix Suns' NBA Summer League coaching staff. He later became an assistant coach for the NBA's Milwaukee Bucks.

== Personal life ==
Goldwire's cousin Leemire, was also a professional basketball player.
