= Keith Williams (basketball, born 1965) =

American basketball player

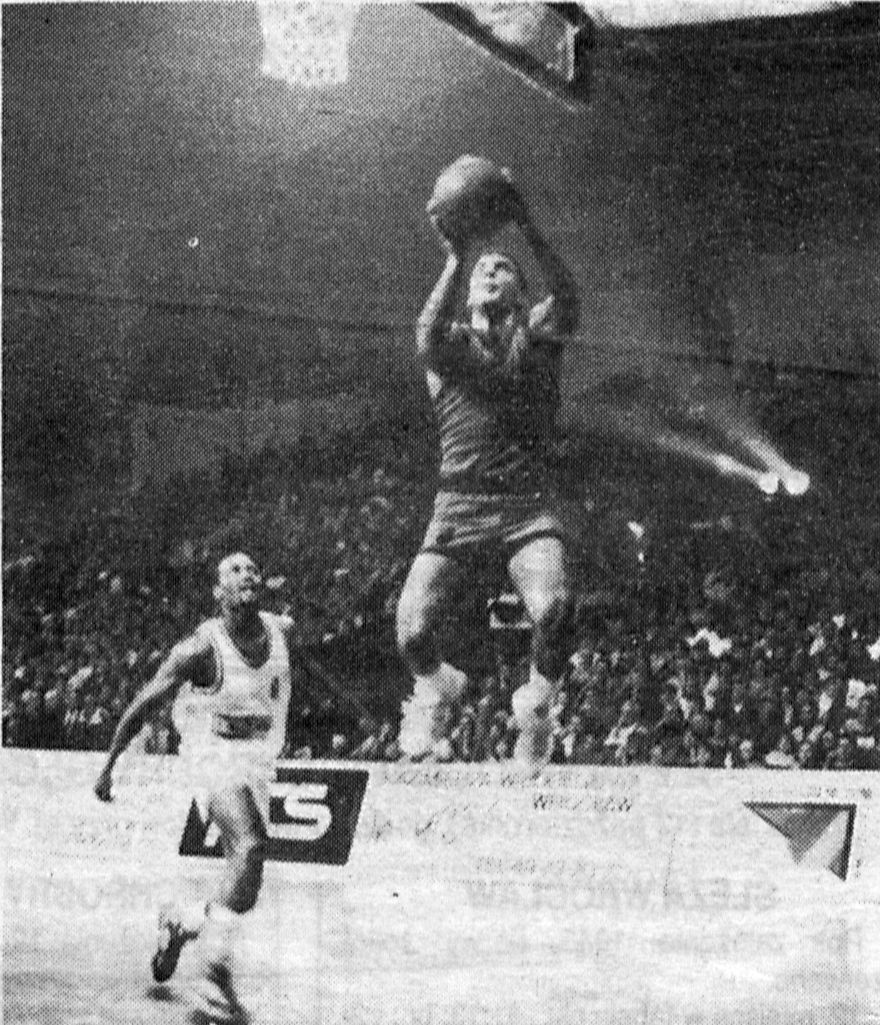
- Williams (Śląsk Wrocław, on the left) and Nikos Galis (Aris, on the right) during a EuroLeague game in 1991.

Personal information
- Born: 30 March 1965 (age 61) New York City, New York
- Listed height: 6 ft 0 in (1.83 m)
- Listed weight: 175 lb (79 kg)

Career information
- College: Charlotte (1983–1987)
- NBA draft: 1987: undrafted
- Playing career: 1987–1999
- Position: Point guard

Career history
- 1987–1988: Basketball Stichting Weert
- 1990–1991: Akrides Haarlem
- 1991–1994: Śląsk Wrocław
- 1994–1995: Mazowszanka Pruszków
- 1995–1997: Stargard Szczeciński
- 1997–1998: Anwil Włocławek
- 1998–1999: 10.5 Poznań

Career highlights
- 4× Polish League champion (1992–1995); Polish Cup winner (1992); Polish League Player of the Year (1994); 4× All-Polish League Team (1992–1995); 4× Polish League Stars Match (1994, 1995, 1996 2×); Dutch Cup winner (1991); Dutch League Top Scorer (1988); 2× All-Dutch League Team (1988, 1991)

Keith David Williams (born March 30, 1965), is an American former professional basketball player. He played college basketball at the University of North Carolina at Charlotte. At 6 ft 0 in (1.83 m) tall, he played at the point guard position.

== College career ==
Williams played college basketball at the University of North Carolina at Charlotte, with the Charlotte 49ers, from 1983 to 1987. During his 4-year college career, he averaged 11.4 points, 4.7 assists, and 2.2 steals per game.

== Professional career ==
Williams scored 42 points in a Dutch League game, on December 16, 1987. He was the Dutch League Top Scorer in 1988. He was a four time Polish League champion (1992, 1993, 1994, 1995). He was the Polish League Player of the Year in 1994. In the 1995–96 season, he scored 50 points in a Polish League game.
