= Eddie Basden =

American basketball player

Personal information
- Born: February 15, 1983 (age 43) New York City, New York, U.S.
- Listed height: 6 ft 5 in (1.96 m)
- Listed weight: 215 lb (98 kg)

Career information
- High school: Eleanor Roosevelt (Greenbelt, Maryland)
- College: Charlotte (2001–2005)
- NBA draft: 2005: undrafted
- Playing career: 2005–2016
- Position: Shooting guard
- Number: 13

Career history
- 2005–2006: Chicago Bulls
- 2006: →Tulsa 66ers
- 2006–2007: Fenerbahçe Ülker
- 2007: Cholet Basket
- 2007–2008: Telekom Bonn
- 2008–2009: Mersin BB
- 2009–2010: Austin Toros
- 2011: Maroussi
- 2011–2012: Franca Basquetebol Clube
- 2012: Petron Blaze Boosters
- 2012–2013: Huracanes de Tampico
- 2013: Trotamundos de Carabobo
- 2013: San Carlos
- 2013–2014: Franca Basquetebol Clube
- 2016: Gigantes del Estado de México

Career highlights
- Turkish League champion (2007); Conference USA Player of the Year (2005); 2× Conference USA Defensive Player of the Year (2004, 2005); First-team All-Conference USA (2005); No. 13 retired by Charlotte 49ers
- Stats at NBA.com
- Stats at Basketball Reference

Edward Richard Basden (born February 15, 1983) is an American professional basketball player who formerly played in the National Basketball Association (NBA).

== College career ==
Basden, born in New York, New York, played competitive basketball in Greenbelt, Maryland at Eleanor Roosevelt High School, where he played against former Chicago Bulls teammate Mike Sweetney. He verbally committed to play college basketball at UMass, choosing them over Villanova, Maryland, Georgetown, and George Mason. He was released from his letter of intent following the resignation of Minutemen head coach Bruiser Flint, and Basden then committed to play for Charlotte. During his career with the 49ers, he was named Conference USA Player of the Year in 2005 and Defensive Player of the Year in 2004 and 2005. In his senior season, he was also named National Defensive Player of the Year by many college basketball analysts. He is the Conference USA all-time leader in career steals, and holds the all-time Charlotte record for steals. His #13 jersey was retired on February 19, 2009.

== Professional career ==
Basden went undrafted in the 2005 NBA draft but was invited to play on the Chicago Bulls Reebok Summer League team, where a strong performance earned him a two-year contract with the Bulls. He appeared in 19 games for the Bulls in 2005–06, averaging 2.1 points per game.

On August 18, 2006, Basden was traded by the Bulls to the Cleveland Cavaliers for center Martynas Andriuskevicius. He was later signed by Fenerbahçe of Turkey. He averaged 8.4 points, 5.3 rebounds, and 3.3 assists in 25 minutes for Fenerbahçe in the Euroleague and was a key player in the team's 2007 Turkish Basketball League championship.

Basden later played for the Austin Toros of the NBA D-League. After finishing his contract with the Toros, he went to play for the Alaska Aces of the Philippine Basketball Association, but was ultimately rejected for exceeding the league's 6 ft 4 in (1.93 m) height limit. In March 2011, he signed with Maroussi BC in Greece. In October 2011 he signed with Franca Basquetebol Clube in Brazil. In 2012, he signed as an import with the Petron Blaze Boosters of the Philippine Basketball Association. He later played for various teams in Latin America.
