= Hal Wissel =

American basketball coach (1939–2025)

Biographical details
- Born: February 8, 1939; New Rochelle, New York, U.S.
- Died: February 10, 2025 (aged 86); Suffield, Connecticut, U.S.

Coaching career (HC unless noted)
- 1964–1967: Trenton State
- 1967–1971: Lafayette
- 1971–1976: Fordham
- 1976–1977: Atlanta Hawks (assistant)
- 1977–1982: Florida Southern
- 1982–1985: Charlotte
- 1986–1990: Springfield
- 1990–1995: Milwaukee Bucks (assistant)
- 1996–1999: New Jersey Nets (assistant)
- 2002–2005: Memphis Grizzlies (assistant)
- 2006–2007: Golden State Warriors (assistant)

Head coaching record
- Overall: 306–348

Harold Robert Wissel (February 8, 1939 – February 10, 2025) was an American basketball coach who worked at the professional and collegiate level in his career.

== Biography ==
Wissel was born in New Rochelle, New York, to Harold and Florence Wissel. He attended New Rochelle High School where he was a three-sport athlete. Wissel graduated from Springfield College in 1960 with a bachelor's degree in physical education. He started his coaching career at Pelham Memorial High School. Wissel received his master's degree in physical education from Indiana University in 1964.

Wissel was an assistant coach for player development with the Golden State Warriors (2006–07), an assistant coach with the Memphis Grizzlies (2002–05), an assistant coach with the New Jersey Nets (1996–99), and an assistant coach with the Atlanta Hawks (1976–77).

Wissel was also an advance scout with the Dallas Mavericks (2001–02), Director of Player Personnel with the New Jersey Nets (1995–96), and advance scout and special assignment coach with the Milwaukee Bucks (1990–95).

In addition to serving in the NBA, Wissel compiled more than 300 wins as a collegiate head coach. Wissel led Florida Southern College to four straight trips to the NCAA Division II Tournament and three straight trips to the Division II Final Four (1980, 1981, and 1982), winning the NCAA Division II National Championship in 1981. Wissel coached Division I Fordham University to the National Invitation Tournament in 1972. Fordham played the toughest schedule in the nation. Wissel coached Division I Lafayette College (1967–71), rebuilding team into conference champion in 1971. Wissel coached The College of New Jersey (1964–67), rebuilding team into conference champion and NAIA National Tournament team in 1967. Wissel coached University of North Carolina at Charlotte (1982–85) where he compiled a 22–62 record. Wissel was dismissed following the 1984–1985 season. He was head coach of the Westchester Golden Apples of the United States Basketball League in 1986.

Wissel's honors include being named Coach & Athlete magazine's Eastern Coach of the Year in 1972; Sunshine State Conference Coach of the Year (1979, 1980, 1981); and NCAA Division II National Coach of the Year by the National Association of Basketball Coaches in 1980. Wissel has been inducted into the Florida Southern College Athletic Hall of Fame and the Sunshine State Conference Hall of Fame. In 1998, Wissel was named Sunshine State Conference Silver Anniversary Coach.

Wissel died on February 10, 2025, at the age of 86.
