= Charlotte 49ers men's basketball =

Men's basketball team of the University of North Carolina

Charlotte 49ers Men's Basketball
| 2026–27 Charlotte 49ers men's basketball team |
- University: University of North Carolina at Charlotte
- First season: 1965–66
- Head coach: Wes Miller (1st season)
- Location: Charlotte, North Carolina
- Arena: Dale F. Halton Arena (capacity: 9,105)
- Conference: The American
- Nickname: 49ers
- Colors: Green and white
- Student section: Niner Nation
- All-time record: 793–661 (.545)

NCAA Division I tournament Final Four
- 1977
Other NCAA Division I tournament results
| Elite Eight | 1977 |
| Sweet Sixteen | 1977 |
| Appearances | 1977, 1988, 1992, 1995, 1997, 1998, 1999, 2001, 2002, 2004, 2005 |

Conference tournament champions
- Dixie: 1969, 1970 Sun Belt: 1977, 1988 Metro: 1992 CUSA: 1999, 2001

Conference regular-season champions
- Sun Belt: 1977, 1978, 1988 Metro: 1995 CUSA: 2004

Uniforms
| Home | Away | Alternate |

The Charlotte 49ers men's basketball team represents the University of North Carolina at Charlotte (UNC Charlotte) in NCAA Division I basketball. Charlotte is a member of the American Conference (The American), which they joined in 2023 after 10 seasons in Conference USA. Charlotte, which had been a charter C-USA member from 1995, returned to that conference in 2013 after leaving in 2005 to join the Atlantic 10 Conference. The 49ers have also played in the Sun Belt Conference and were a member of the Metro Conference, which merged with the Great Midwest Conference to form Conference USA.

The basketball team has spent the better part of its history in the shadow of the state's four Atlantic Coast Conference teams. However, the 49ers have carved out a niche of their own, making 11 appearances in the NCAA tournament, most recently in 2005. In their first appearance, in 1977, they advanced all the way to the Final Four—at the time, the deepest run for a first-time tournament participant. They have also earned regular and post-season championships in three different conferences, as well as a victory in the College Basketball Invitational (CBI) in 2023.

The 49ers play their home games in Dale F. Halton Arena, an on-campus facility that seats 9,105.

== History ==
=== Early years (1965–1975) ===
UNC Charlotte first fielded an intercollegiate basketball program in 1965. Chancellor Bonnie Cone appointed Harvey Murphy, previously a physical education instructor and head of the physical education program at the university, as the first head coach in school history. Murphy coached the 49ers in the NAIA as a member of the Dixie Conference from 1965 through 1970, winning the conference in 1969 and 1970.

Bill Foster was hired to succeed Harvey Murphy after the 1969–1970 season as the 49ers moved from the NAIA to Division I as an independent. Foster notched two 20-win seasons in 1973–1974 and 1974–1975 before moving on to coach at Clemson. Foster's lasting legacy on the program was bringing in two of the most notable players on the team which would advance to the 1977 Final Four: Cedric Maxwell and Melvin Watkins.

=== Lee Rose years (1975–1977) ===
After Bill Foster left for Clemson, Lee Rose was hired as the head coach in 1975. Rose inherited a team coming off of two 20-win seasons and led them to the NIT championship game in his first year. The following season the 49ers became a charter member of the Sun Belt Conference.

==== Final Four ====
In their first year in the Sun Belt, the 49ers tallied what is still the best season in school history. They swept the regular season and tournament titles, earning the program's first NCAA Tournament berth. The ensuing NCAA tournament run is still one of the most successful ever for a first-time participant. After beating Central Michigan in the first round 91–86, the 49ers dispatched Syracuse 81–59 to advance to the Elite Eight. The 49ers then took out heavily favored Michigan by a score of 75–68 to advance to the program's first and only Final Four—the first time that a first-time participant had ever advanced that far. Charlotte would fall to eventual champions Marquette in the national semifinals 51–49. Their final record was 28–5, still a school record for wins in a season.

Despite the loss of the two leaders of the Final Four team from the previous season, Lee Rose guided the 49ers to a fifth consecutive 20-win season in 1977–1978. Rose would then leave to coach at Purdue for the 1978–1979 season. Rose's .800 winning percentage at Charlotte remains the highest in school history.

=== Post-Rose years (1978–1985) ===
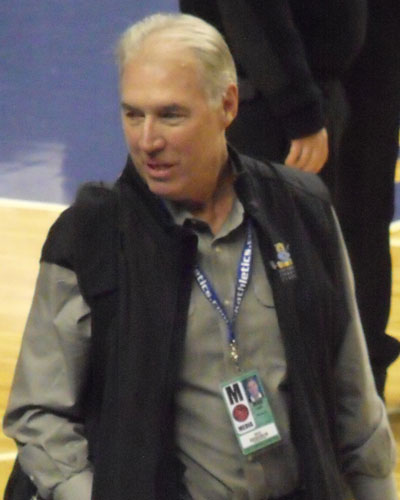
Mike Pratt. Charlotte head coach from 1978–1982

Following Rose's departure, Mike Pratt, an assistant under Rose at Charlotte, was named the head coach for the 1978–1979 season. In his first and only head coaching job, Pratt could not maintain the success of the program under Rose, compiling a 56–52 record over four seasons with no postseason appearances. The best year under Pratt was the 1978–1979 season in which the 49ers earned a 16–11 record and a second place Sun Belt finish. Pratt was dismissed following the 1981–1982 season.

Following Pratt's dismissal, the 49ers hired Hal Wissel as head basketball coach. Wissel was previously a successful coach at many levels, but his tenure would be the least successful in the Charlotte's history at the Division 1 level. After three seasons and a 22–62 record, Wissel was dismissed following the 1984–1985 season.

=== Jeff Mullins years (1985–1996) ===
Following Wissel's dismissal, Jeff Mullins was hired as both head basketball coach and athletic director. Mullins guided the 49ers through multiple conference changes and kicked off the most successful, sustained run in school history.

Mullins inherited a last place Sun Belt team and things didn't improve in his first season with an 8–20 record. However, in just his second year he guided the 49ers back above .500 for the first time in five seasons, leading them to an 18–14 record in 1986–1987. A year later, sparked by Sun Belt Player of the Year Byron Dinkins, Mullins coached the 49ers to the Sun Belt regular season and post-season championships and the program's first NCAA tournament berth since their Final Four run. Seeded 13th, the 49ers lost to 4th seed BYU in the first round of the Southeast Regional by a score of 98–92.

The following season the 49ers finished second in the Sun Belt and earned an NIT berth. In their final two seasons in the Sun Belt, Mullins led the 49ers to a 30–28 record with no postseason appearances.

==== Metro Conference (1992–1995) ====
Prior to the 1992–1993 season the 49ers moved to the Metro Conference. In their four seasons in the Metro Conference, the 49ers never finished lower than 4th in the standings, won one regular season conference title, and one post-season conference title. The success was rewarded with two NCAA Tournament berths, in 1992 and 1995, losing in the first round both times.

==== Conference USA ====
After the 1994–1995 season, the 49ers joined Conference USA. In what would be Mullins' last season, Charlotte went 14–15 in 1995–1996, finishing tied for 6th in the league. Mullins retired following that season as the all-time winningest coach in school history with 182 wins and also had more postseason appearances than all previous coaches combined.

Former on-the-court star and longtime assistant coach for the 49ers Melvin Watkins took over as head coach for the 1996–1997 season. Watkins had two successful seasons as the Charlotte head coach, leading the team into the second round of the NCAA tournament in both years. He left to take the head coaching job at Texas A&M in 1998.

=== Bobby Lutz years (1998–2010) ===
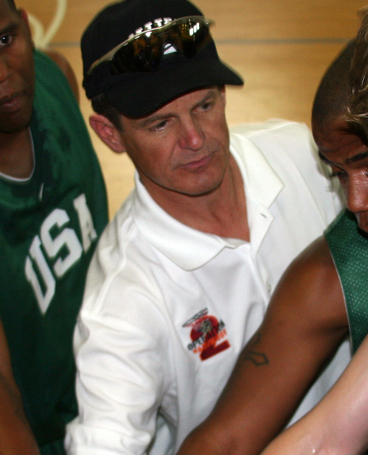
Bobby Lutz. Charlotte head coach from 1998 to 2010

After Watkins left for Texas A&M, Charlotte named Bobby Lutz its new head coach. Lutz was an assistant under both Watkins and Jeff Mullins at Charlotte. Lutz accepted the head coaching job at Gardner–Webb in 1995 only to resign two weeks later to accept the assistant job at his alma mater on Mullin's staff.

Lutz's success in Conference USA was sustained and stretched in Charlotte basketball history. The 49ers reached the NCAA Tournament in 5 of the 7 years they were in Conference USA under Lutz.

In his first season, Lutz guided the 49ers to a 10–6 record in CUSA. Seeded fifth in the conference tournament, the 49ers won four games in four days, taking out three of the top four seeds in the process to win the CUSA conference tournament for the first time. This earned Charlotte a 5 seed in the NCAA tournament. They defeated Rhode Island in the first round before falling to 13-seed Oklahoma in round two.

The 1999–2000 season would be defined by the passing of Charles Hayward in September 1999. Hayward lost a two-year battle with Leukemia, he would have his jersey retired. Charlotte would play to a 17–16 record and earn an NIT berth.

The 2000–2001 seasons saw the arrival of Rodney White who would become the top scoring freshman in the country and be named ESPN's National Freshmen of the Year. Led by White, Charlotte would win its second CUSA Tournament Title in three years and earn a 9 seed in the NCAA tournament with a 22–11 record. Charlotte would defeat Tennessee in the first round of the Midwest Regional before falling to #1 seed Illinois in the round of 32. White would leave Charlotte for the NBA draft and be selected 9th overall by the Detroit Pistons.

Over the following three seasons the 49ers would earn two additional NCAA tournament bids, in 2002 and 2004, earning #9 seeds and being eliminated in the first round both years.

The 2004–2005 season would see the 49ers return to the top 25 behind eventual CUSA Player of the Year Eddie Basden, he would also win CUSA Defensive POY for the second straight season. The promising season would take a turn for the worse in the last few weeks. The 49ers lost a game on senior night at Louisville which would determine the regular season conference champion. They followed that with a loss on an emotional senior night at South Florida. They then drew a Memphis team in the CUSA tournament who had under-performed all year but caught fire at the end of the season. Charlotte was bounced from the first round of the CUSA tournament and had their season ended in round 1 of the NCAA tournament by NC State.

==== Atlantic 10 ====
Following the exodus of many of the top basketball programs from CUSA to the Big East in 2005, Charlotte was left as a non-football school in an increasingly weak basketball conference despite having the second best record in CUSA history at the time, trailing only Cincinnati. Charlotte eventually joined the Atlantic 10 for all sports along with fellow CUSA member Saint Louis. Lutz was not able to sustain the level of success he achieved in CUSA. Over the course of six seasons in the A10, Lutz's record was 83–75, compared to his record of 135–83 in CUSA. The 49ers earned two NIT bids under Lutz in the A10, going 1–2 in those tournaments. The 49ers fell apart to end the 2009–2010 season. With eight games to go in the regular season, they were 18-5 and in first place in the A10, and appeared well on their way to an NCAA bid. However, they went 1–7 the rest of the way, and didn't even receive an NIT bid. Lutz was dismissed following this collapse.

Lutz had more wins (218) and NCAA tournament appearances (5) than any other coach in Charlotte history. His firing was met with mixed emotions among students and fans.

=== Alan Major years (2010–2015) ===
On April 12, 2010 Alan Major was announced as the new head coach of the Charlotte 49ers. The coaching search targeted assistants at successful high-level programs, Major was a member of Thad Matta's staff at Ohio State which included a national title game appearance. Throughout his career Major has a history of helping highly skilled big men develop into great NBA prospects. He coached two future #1 overall draft picks in Michael Olowokandi and Greg Oden while at Pacific and Ohio State, respectively. He also came in with A10 experience having been as assistant under Matta at Xavier.

Major's first season was headlined by the dismissal of one senior big man, Shamarri Spears, in the Fall and another, Phil Jones, not qualifying academically for the Spring semester. The early season schedule was highlighted by a 49–48 victory over #7 ranked Tennessee and a 2OT win at Georgia Tech. Following Jones being ruled ineligible, the team was left with just 8 scholarship players for the remainder of the season and would struggle in conference play, finishing with a 2–14 league record and failing to make the A10 conference tournament for the first time. The three-year postseason drought had been the longest for the program since Jeff Mullins took over in 1985.

The 2011–2012 season saw less off-the-court drama, although individual players were benched for disciplinary reasons, but there was little improvement in terms of wins and losses. The 49ers would finish with a 13–17 record, 5–11 in conference play. This was an improvement of Major's first year and earned them an A10 tournament spot, a first round loss at St. Joe's. Chris Braswell would average 15.6 points and 7.6 rebounds per game and be named to the A10 All-Conference Third Team. Pierriá Henry was among the nation's leaders in steals and earned a spot on the A10 All-Rookie Team.

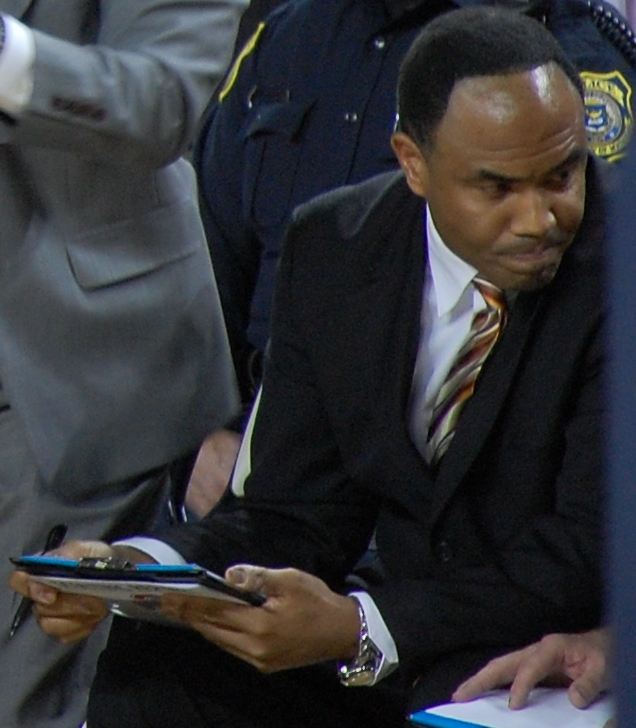
Alan Major. Charlotte head coach from 2010–2015

The 2012–2013 season resulted in an improved 21–12 record and a berth in the NIT. The season was successful overall, but the 49ers lost four games in a row in February/March which removed them from NCAA tournament consideration. This was followed by a miraculous first round A10 tournament victory over Richmond in which Pierriá Henry took 11 free throws in the final 4.7 seconds of game time to overcome a 3-point deficit. Richmond was called for three technical fouls, one non-shooting foul and one shooting foul in that time. The 49ers followed this with a blowout loss to St. Louis in the 2nd round. In the NIT the 49ers were eliminated in round 1 at Providence.

Following the 2012–13 season, Darion Clark announced he was leaving the program. Clark saw a total of seven minutes in the 49ers' two A10 tournament games, a large drop from his regular season average. In late April forward E. Victor Nickerson also announced he was transferring, leaving Charlotte with only 6 scholarship players on roster.

==== Return to Conference USA ====
The 2013–2014 season, in which the 49ers would rejoin Conference USA and claim the Puerto Rico Tip-Off Championship by beating a ranked Michigan team; ended with a late season 6 game losing streak in conference play, and the 49ers finishing with a 17–14 record and a second round exit from the C-USA Tournament.

Having taken a medical leave of absence following the 2013–14 season, Coach Major would take another such leave during the second half of the 2014–15 season. Assistant Head Coach Ryan Odom would coach the team for the remainder of the season. Following the conclusion of the 2014–2015 season it was announced that Major would step down as head coach. His record as 49ers head coach was 67 wins to 70 losses with the program attaining an overall record during his tenure of 75 to 81. Significant milestones included winning the 2012 Great Alaska Shootout and 2013 Puerto Rico Tip-off tournaments and victories over #7 ranked Tennessee, #10 ranked Butler, and previous National Championship runners-up, #14 ranked Michigan.

=== Mark Price years (2015–2017) ===
On March 25, 2015, former NBA point guard and NBA Charlotte Hornets assistant coach, Mark Price was offered a five-year contract to become the 49ers head coach, which he accepted. Price was fired on December 14, 2017, after a 30–42 record in 2 1/2 seasons at Charlotte and was replaced by assistant coach Houston Fancher.

=== Ron Sanchez years (2018–2023) ===
On March 19, 2018, Ron Sanchez was named the 12th head coach in Charlotte 49ers men's basketball program history. Sanchez was a former volunteer assistant at Indiana before going to Washington State. Sanchez was hired by Dick Bennett, and remained on the staff when Bennett's son Tony took over. Sanchez accompanied Tony Bennett to Virginia in 2009 as an assistant and was promoted to associate head coach in 2015.

On June 6, 2023, Sanchez resigned to rejoin Bennett's staff at Virginia as associate head coach. Coincidentally, Sanchez left less than a month before Charlotte's move from C-USA to The American became official.

On June 15, 2023, associate head coach Aaron Fearne agreed to lead the team as interim head coach for the 2023–24 inaugural AAC season.

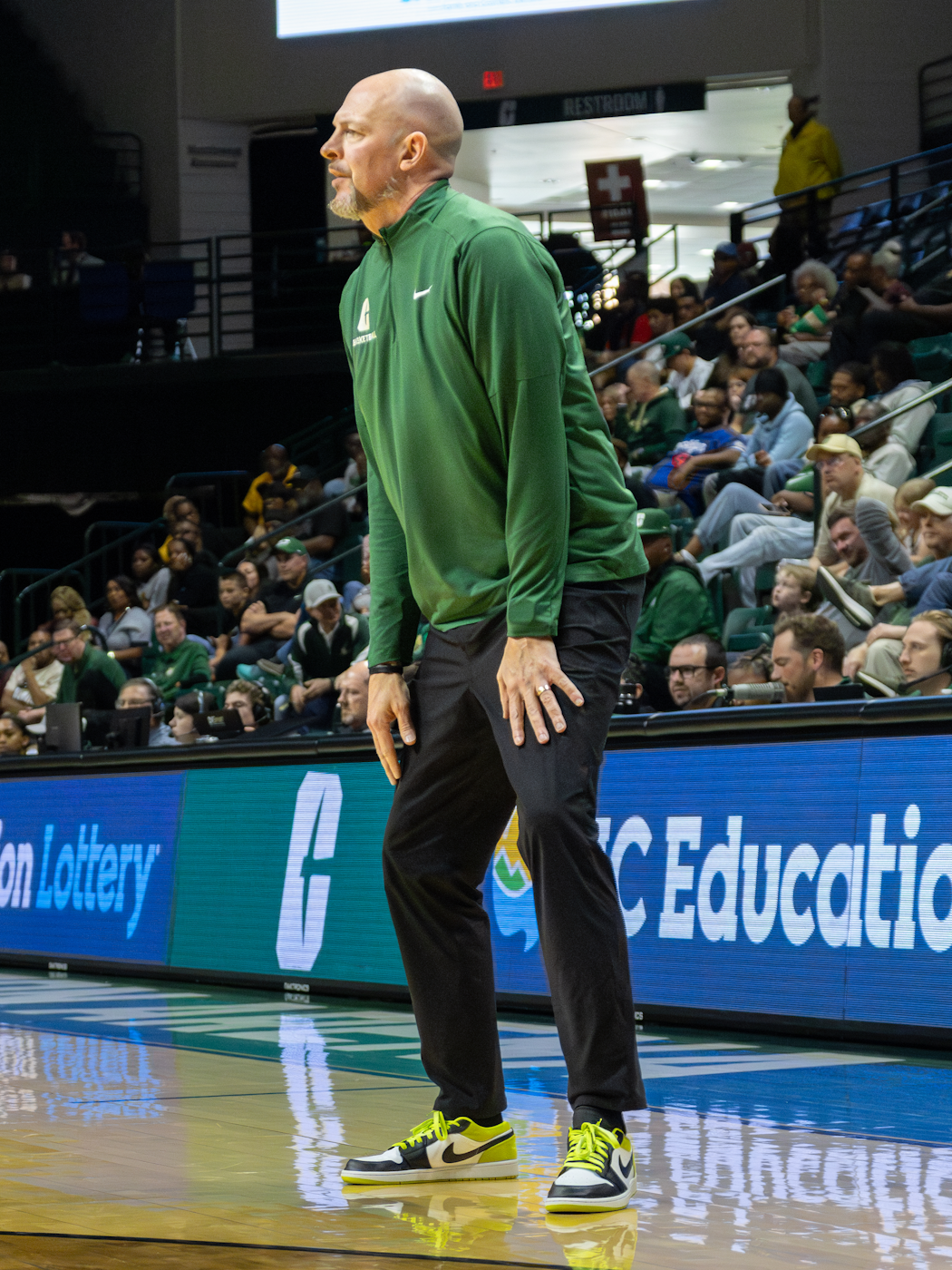
Aaron Fearne. Charlotte head coach since 2023

=== Aaron Fearne (2023–2026) ===
==== The American ====
On July 1, 2023, all Charlotte 49ers athletics programs joined the American Conference.

Interim coach Aaron Fearne picked up his first win when the 49ers when they took down Maine. The 49ers won their first game in American Conference play when they defeated number seventeen ranked Florida Atlantic. It was Charlotte's first win over a ranked team since 2013 and first ranked win over a team at home since 2010.

On February 12, 2024, Fearne was received a contract to become the official head coach of the Charlotte basketball program.

On March 17, 2026, Director of Athletics Kevin White announced that Fearne would not return as head coach following the 2025–26 season.

=== Wes Miller (2026–present) ===
On March 23, 2026, Wes Miller was announced as the new head coach.

== Team record ==
Record table
| Season | Coach | Overall | Conference | Standing | Postseason |
|---|---|---|---|---|---|
Dixie Intercollegiate Athletic Conference (NAIA) (1963–1970)
| 1963–1964 | Irv Edelman | | 5–5 | 4th | |
| 1964–1965 | Irv Edelman | | 9–1 | 1st | |
| 1965–1966 | Harvey Murphy | 6–17 | 4–6 | 4th | |
| 1966–1967 | Harvey Murphy | 7–21 | 7–5 | 3rd | |
| 1967–1968 | Harvey Murphy | 5–17 | 3–9 | 6th | |
| 1968–1969 | Harvey Murphy | 12–10 | 9–5 | T–2nd | |
| 1969–1970 | Harvey Murphy | 14–16 | 10–4 | T–2nd | NAIA District Playoffs |
Independent (Division I) (1970–1976)
| 1970–1971 | Bill Foster | 15–8 | | | |
| 1971–1972 | Bill Foster | 14–11 | | | |
| 1972–1973 | Bill Foster | 14–12 | | | |
| 1973–1974 | Bill Foster | 22–4 | | | |
| 1974–1975 | Bill Foster | 23–3 | | | |
| 1975–1976 | Lee Rose | 24–6 | | | NIT Runner-Up |
Sun Belt Conference (Division I) (1976–1991)
| 1976–1977 | Lee Rose | 28–5 | 5–1 | 1st | NCAA Final Four |
| 1977–1978 | Lee Rose | 20–7 | 9–1 | 1st | |
| 1978–1979 | Mike Pratt | 16–11 | 6–4 | 2nd | |
| 1979–1980 | Mike Pratt | 15–12 | 9–5 | 4th | |
| 1980–1981 | Mike Pratt | 10–17 | 3–9 | 6th | |
| 1981–1982 | Mike Pratt | 15–12 | 3–7 | 5th | |
| 1982–1983 | Hal Wissel | 8–20 | 5–9 | 6th | |
| 1983–1984 | Hal Wissel | 9–19 | 2–12 | 8th | |
| 1984–1985 | Hal Wissel | 5–23 | 1–13 | 8th | |
| 1985–1986 | Jeff Mullins | 8–20 | 1–13 | 8th | |
| 1986–1987 | Jeff Mullins | 18–14 | 6–8 | T–6th | |
| 1987–1988 | Jeff Mullins | 22–9 | 11–3 | 1st | NCAA First Round |
| 1988–1989 | Jeff Mullins | 17–12 | 10–4 | 2nd | NIT First Round |
| 1989–1990 | Jeff Mullins | 16–14 | 6–8 | 5th | |
| 1990–1991 | Jeff Mullins | 14–14 | 6–8 | 6th | |
Metro Conference (Division I) (1991–1995)
| 1991–1992 | Jeff Mullins | 23–9 | 7–5 | 2nd | NCAA First Round |
| 1992–1993 | Jeff Mullins | 15–13 | 6–6 | T–4th | |
| 1993–1994 | Jeff Mullins | 16–13 | 7–5 | T–2nd | NIT First Round |
| 1994–1995 | Jeff Mullins | 19–9 | 8–4 | 1st | NCAA First Round |
Conference USA (Division I) (1995–2005)
| 1995–1996 | Jeff Mullins | 14–15 | 6–8 | T–6th | |
| 1996–1997 | Melvin Watkins | 22–9 | 10–4 | 3rd | NCAA Second Round |
| 1997–1998 | Melvin Watkins | 20–11 | 13–3 | 2nd | NCAA Second Round |
| 1998–1999 | Bobby Lutz | 23–11 | 10–6 | T–3rd | NCAA Second Round |
| 1999–2000 | Bobby Lutz | 17–16 | 7–9 | T–5th | NIT First Round |
| 2000–2001 | Bobby Lutz | 22–11 | 10–6 | 2nd | NCAA Second Round |
| 2001–2002 | Bobby Lutz | 18–12 | 11–5 | 3rd | NCAA First Round |
| 2002–2003 | Bobby Lutz | 13–16 | 8–8 | 5th | |
| 2003–2004 | Bobby Lutz | 21–9 | 12–4 | 1st | NCAA First Round |
| 2004–2005 | Bobby Lutz | 21–8 | 12–4 | 2nd | NCAA First Round |
Atlantic 10 Conference (Division I) (2005–2013)
| 2005–2006 | Bobby Lutz | 19–13 | 11–5 | 2nd | NIT First Round |
| 2006–2007 | Bobby Lutz | 14–16 | 7–9 | 9th | |
| 2007–2008 | Bobby Lutz | 20–14 | 9–7 | T–4th | NIT First Round |
| 2008–2009 | Bobby Lutz | 11–20 | 5–11 | 12th | |
| 2009–2010 | Bobby Lutz | 19–12 | 9–7 | 6th | |
| 2010–2011 | Alan Major | 10–20 | 2–14 | 13th | |
| 2011–2012 | Alan Major | 13–17 | 5–11 | 11th | |
| 2012–2013 | Alan Major | 21–12 | 8–8 | T–8th | NIT First Round |
Conference USA (Division I) (2013–2023)
| 2013–2014 | Alan Major | 17–14 | 7–9 | T-5th | |
| 2014–2015 | Alan Major | 14–18 | 7–11 | 11th | |
| 2015–2016 | Mark Price | 14–19 | 9–9 | 7th | |
| 2016–2017 | Mark Price | 13–17 | 7–11 | 7th | |
| 2017–2018 | Mark Price, Houston Fancher (Interim) | 6–23 | 2–16 | 14th | |
| 2018–2019 | Ron Sanchez | 8–21 | 5–13 | 13th | |
| 2019–2020 | Ron Sanchez | 16–13 | 10–8 | T–4th | |
| 2020–2021 | Ron Sanchez | 9–16 | 5–11 | 5th East | |
| 2021–2022 | Ron Sanchez | 17–14 | 10–8 | 4th East | |
| 2022–2023 | Ron Sanchez | 22–14 | 9–11 | 5th | CBI Champion |
American Conference (Division I) (2023–present)
| 2023–24 | Aaron Fearne | 19–12 | 13–5 | 3rd | |
| 2024–25 | Aaron Fearne | 11–22 | 3–15 | 13th | |
| 2025–26 | Aaron Fearne | 17–17 | 9–9 | T–5th | |
| 2026–27 | Wes Miller | 0–0 | 0–0 | | |
| Total: | | 922–789 (.539) | | | |
National champion Postseason invitational champion Conference regular season champion Conference regular season and conference tournament champion Division regular season champion Division regular season and conference tournament champion Conference tournament champion

== Postseason ==
=== NCAA tournament results ===
The 49ers have appeared in the NCAA tournament 11 times. Their combined record is 7–12.

| Year | Seed | Round | Opponent | Result |
|---|---|---|---|---|
| 1977 | | First Round; Sweet Sixteen; Elite Eight; Final Four; National 3rd Place Game | Central Michigan; Syracuse; Michigan; Marquette; UNLV | W 91–86^{OT} W 81–59; W 75–68; L 49–51; L 94–106 |
| 1988 | #13 | First Round | #4 BYU | L 92–98^{OT} |
| 1992 | #7 | First Round | #10 Iowa State | L 74–76 |
| 1995 | #7 | First Round | #10 Stanford | L 68–70 |
| 1997 | #7 | First Round; Second Round | #10 Georgetown #2 Utah | W 79–67; L 58–77 |
| 1998 | #8 | First Round; Second Round | #9 UIC #1 North Carolina | W 77–62; L 83–93^{OT} |
| 1999 | #5 | First Round; Second Round | #12 Rhode Island #13 Oklahoma | W 81–70; L 72–85 |
| 2001 | #9 | First Round; Second Round | #8 Tennessee #1 Illinois | W 70–63; L 61–79 |
| 2002 | #9 | First Round | #8 Notre Dame | L 63–82 |
| 2004 | #9 | First Round | #8 Texas Tech | L 73–76 |
| 2005 | #7 | First Round | #10 NC State | L 63–75 |

=== NIT results ===
The 49ers have appeared in the National Invitation Tournament (NIT) seven times. Their combined record is 4–7.

| Year | Round | Opponent | Result |
|---|---|---|---|
| 1976 | First Round; Quarterfinals; Semifinals; Finals | San Francisco; Oregon; NC State; Kentucky | W 79–74; W 79–72; W 80–79; L 67–71 |
| 1989 | First Round | Connecticut | L 62–67 |
| 1994 | First Round | Duquesne | L 73–75 |
| 2000 | First Round | Ole Miss | L 45–62 |
| 2006 | Opening Round; First Round | Georgia Southern; Cincinnati | W 77–61; L 80–86 |
| 2008 | First Round | Nebraska | L 48–67 |
| 2013 | First Round | Providence | L 66–75 |

=== CBI results ===
The 49ers have appeared in the College Basketball Invitational (CBI) once in 2023, winning the tournament. Their combined record is 4–0.

| Year | Round | Opponent | Result |
|---|---|---|---|
| 2023 | First Round; Quarterfinals; Semifinals; Finals | Western Carolina; Milwaukee; Radford; Eastern Kentucky | W 65–56; W 76–65; W 63–56; W 71–68 |

== Coaches ==
=== Current coaching staff ===
| Name | Position |
|---|---|
| Wes Miller | Head coach |
| | Associate Head Coach |
| | Assistant coach |
| | Assistant coach |

=== Head coach history ===
| Tenure | Coach | Years | Record | Pct. |
|---|---|---|---|---|
| 1963–65 | Irv Edelman | 2 | 14–6 | .700 |
| 1965–70 | Harvey Murphy | 5 | 44–71 | .383 |
| 1970–75 | Bill Foster | 5 | 88–38 | .698 |
| 1975–78 | Lee Rose | 3 | 72–18 | .800 |
| 1978–82 | Mike Pratt | 4 | 56–52 | .519 |
| 1982–85 | Hal Wissel | 3 | 22–62 | .262 |
| 1985–96 | Jeff Mullins | 11 | 182–142 | .507 |
| 1996–98 | Melvin Watkins | 2 | 42–20 | .677 |
| 1998–2010 | Bobby Lutz | 12 | 218–158 | .580 |
| 2010–15 | Alan Major | 5 | 75–81 | .481 |
| 2015–17 | Mark Price | 3 | 30–42 | .417 |
| 2017–18 | Houston Fancher | 1 | 3–17 | .150 |
| 2018–2023 | Ron Sanchez | 5 | 72–78 | .480 |
| 2023–2026 | Aaron Fearne | 3 | 47–51 | .480 |
| 2026–Present | Wes Miller | 1 | 0–0 | |
| Totals | 14 Coaches | 62 Seasons | 922-789 | .539 |

An asterisk (*) denotes a season currently in progress.

List of Charlotte 49ers men's basketball head coaches

== Notable players ==
=== Retired numbers ===
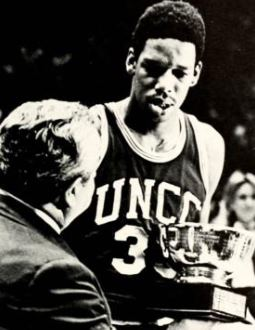
Cedric Maxwell has his #33 retired by Charlotte

| No. | Player | Career | Ref. |
|---|---|---|---|
| 4 | Byron Dinkins | 1985–1989 | |
| 4 | DeMarco Johnson | 1994–1998 | |
| 13 | Eddie Basden | 2002–2005 | |
| 23 | Jarvis Lang | 1990–1991; 1992–1995 | |
| 32 | Melvin Watkins | 1973–1977 | |
| 33 | Cedric Maxwell | 1973–1977 | |
| 34 | Henry Williams | 1988–1992 | |
| 45 | Charles Hayward | 1997–1999 | |

=== Conference Player of the Year winners ===
| Conference | Player | Season |
|---|---|---|
| Sun Belt | Cedric Maxwell | 1976–1977 |
| Sun Belt | Byron Dinkins | 1987–1988 |
| Metro | Jarvis Lang | 1994–1995 |
| Conference USA | DeMarco Johnson | 1997–1998 |
| Conference USA | Eddie Basden | 2004–2005 |

=== Professional players ===
The following Charlotte basketball players appeared in at least one game in the NBA:

- Cedric Ball (1990)
- Eddie Basden (2005–2006)
- Sean Colson (2000–2001)
- Byron Dinkins (1990–1991)
- DeMarco Johnson (1999–2000)
- Chad Kinch (1980–1981)
- Cedric Maxwell (1977–1988)
- Rodney White (2001–2005)

== Home venues ==
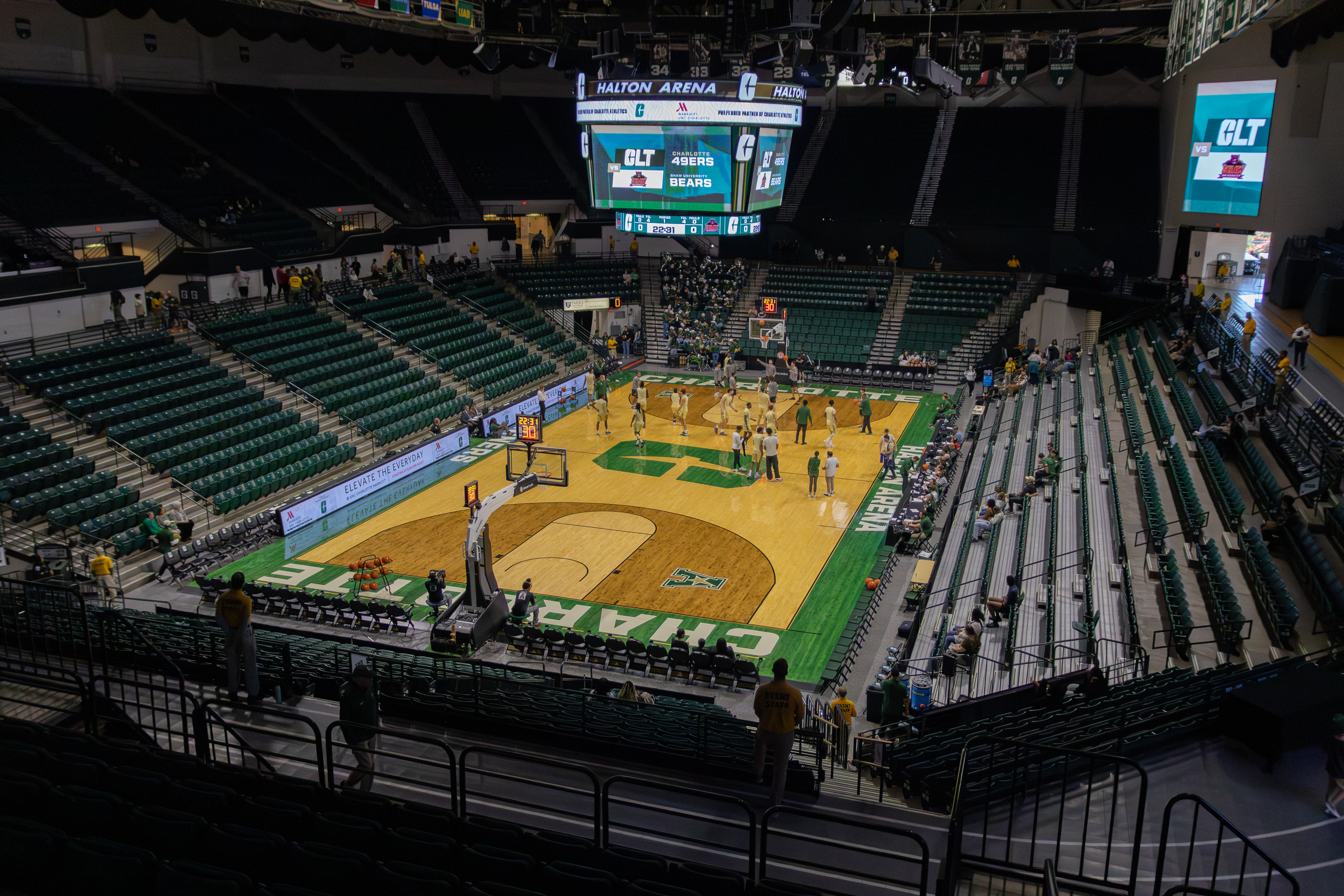
Dale F. Halton Arena, the home of Charlotte 49ers Basketball since 1996

- Local high school gymnasiums (1963–1970)
- Belk Gymnasium (full-time 1970–1976, part-time 1976–1996)
- Bojangles Coliseum (1976–1988, 1993–1996)
- Charlotte Coliseum (1988–1993)
- Dale F. Halton Arena (1996–present)
  - Spectrum Center (occasional, 2007–present)

== Rivalries ==
=== Hornet's Nest Trophy ===
Charlotte's annual rivalry with the Davidson Wildcats sees Mecklenburg County's two oldest Division I programs go head-to-head for the Hornet's Nest Trophy. The trophy takes its name from a historical description of the Charlotte area; during the American Revolutionary War the city was dubbed "a hornet's nest of rebellion" by General Charles Cornwallis, which has stuck throughout the years and led to various entities in the area (not least of which the NBA team) adopting hornet motifs. The Hornet's Nest series began in the 1979–80 season. The teams have met 46 times. Charlotte leads the all-time series, 29–17. The series has been a see-saw affair; Charlotte was long the dominant team in the area, but the Stephen Curry-led resurgence of the Wildcats, as well as their transition to the Atlantic 10 as the 49ers moved out for football reasons, has seen the power shift towards Lake Norman as the 21st century has progressed.

=== Past rivalries ===
Charlotte has had its fair share of intense rivalries. One of the most heated and intense rivalries was with the Bob Huggins-coached Cincinnati Bearcats of Conference USA. Throughout a ten-year period from 1995–96 to 2004–05, Charlotte managed to upset Cincinnati teams ranked #3, #8, #18, #20 in the country. Fueled by "Huggins swallows" pregame chants what became known as the Cincinnati Incident, a brawl broke out between Cincinnati and the Charlotte student section, when a Cincinnati player threw the basketball into the stands. This led to the creation of a 'buffer zone' being implemented behind the visiting team's bench. ESPN commentator Andy Katz provided this explanation on why Charlotte-Cincinnati was one of the juiciest rivalries in the country: "The games are hotly contested usually and the fans in Charlotte don't like Cincinnati. They get up for this game more than any other."

== Records ==
=== All-Time leaders ===
Points
| Rank | Player | Years | Points |
|---|---|---|---|
| 1 | Henry Williams | 1988–1992 | 2383 |
| 2 | Jon Davis | 2015–2019 | 2113 |
| 3 | Lew Massey | 1974–1978 | 2149 |
| 4 | Chad Kinch | 1976–1980 | 2020 |
| 5 | DeMarco Johnson | 1994–1998 | 2005 |
| 6 | Jarvis Lang | 1990–1991, 1992–1995 | 1855 |
| 7 | Cedric Maxwell | 1973–1977 | 1824 |
| 8 | Curtis Withers | 2003–2006 | 1750 |
| 9 | Jobey Thomas | 1998–2001 | 1737 |
| 10 | Leemire Goldwire | 2005–2008 | 1677 |

Rebounds
| Rank | Player | Years | Rebounds |
|---|---|---|---|
| 1 | Cedric Maxwell | 1973–1977 | 1117 |
| 2 | Jarvis Lang | 1990–1991, 1992–1995 | 1047 |
| 3 | Curtis Withers | 2003–2006 | 1042 |
| 4 | DeMarco Johnson | 1994–1998 | 926 |
| 5 | Norris Dae | 1968–1972 | 858 |

Assists
| Rank | Player | Years | Assists |
|---|---|---|---|
| 1 | Pierriá Henry | 2011–2015 | 555 |
| 2 | Jon Davis | 2015–2019 | 547 |
| 3 | Keith Williams | 1983–1987 | 515 |
| 4 | Byron Dinkins | 1985–1989 | 513 |
| 5 | Delano Johnson | 1989–1992, 1993–1994 | 496 |

Steals
| Rank | Player | Years | Steals |
|---|---|---|---|
| 1 | Pierriá Henry | 2011–2015 | 293 |
| 2 | Eddie Basden | 2001–2005 | 264 |
| 3 | Keith Williams | 1983–1987 | 236 |
| 4 | Phil Ward | 1978–1982 | 221 |
| 5 | Leemire Goldwire | 2005–2008 | 190 |
| 6 | Delano Johnson | 1989–1992, 1993–1994 | 189 |
| 7 | Henry Williams | 1988–1992 | 181 |
| 8 | Jeff West | 1985–1989 | 150 |
| T – 9 | Demon Brown | 2001–2004 | 149 |
| T – 9 | Jarvis Lang | 1990–1991, 1992–1995 | 149 |

Blocks
| Rank | Player | Years | Blocks |
|---|---|---|---|
| 1 | Ray Gromlowicz | 1983–1987 | 194 |
| 2 | Jermain Parker | 1992–1995 | 177 |
| 3 | Phil Jones | 2008–2010 | 158 |
| 4 | Jarvis Lang | 1990–1991, 1992–1995 | 103 |
| 5 | Rodney Odom | 1991–1993 | 94 |

Games Played
| Rank | Player | Years | Games |
|---|---|---|---|
| 1 | Jobey Thomas | 1998–2001 | 130 |
| 2 | Leemire Goldwire | 2005–2008 | 125 |
| 3-T | Mitchell Baldwin | 2001–2006 | 124 |
| 3-T | Diego Guevara | 1997–2001 | 124 |
| 4 | Tremaine Gardiner | 1995–1997, 1998–2000 | 123 |

Three Pointers Made
| Rank | Player | Years | Three Pointers Made |
|---|---|---|---|
| 1 | Jobey Thomas | 1998–2001 | 346 |
| 2 | Leemire Goldwire | 2005–2008 | 343 |
| 3 | Demon Brown | 2001–2004 | 341 |
| 4 | Henry Williams | 1988–1992 | 308 |
| 5 | Diego Guevara | 1997–2001 | 235 |

=== Single game records ===
| Stat | Player | Date | Record | Opponent |
|---|---|---|---|---|
| Points | George Jackson | 2/8/1975 | 44 | Samford |
| Free throws Made | Sean Colson & DeMarco Johnson | 12/20/1997 & 2/9/1998 | 16 | G. Washington & Tulane |
| Rebounds | Ben Basinger & Cedric Maxwell | 12/3/1970 & 2/19/1977 | 24 | Florida Presbyterian & Seton Hall |
| Assists | Sean Colson | 2/28/1998 | 18 | Houston |
| Steals | Eddie Basden (twice), 7 other players | 2/2/2008 (latest, Charlie Coley) | 7 | Richmond (latest) |
| Blocks | Lew Massey | 12/9/1975 | 10 | Wofford |
| Minutes played | Phil Ward | 1/5/1981 | 53 | Jacksonville |
| Three pointers Made | Brendan Plavich | 11/26/2003 | 10 | Syracuse |
