= Bill Foster (basketball, born 1936) =

American college basketball coach (1936–2015)

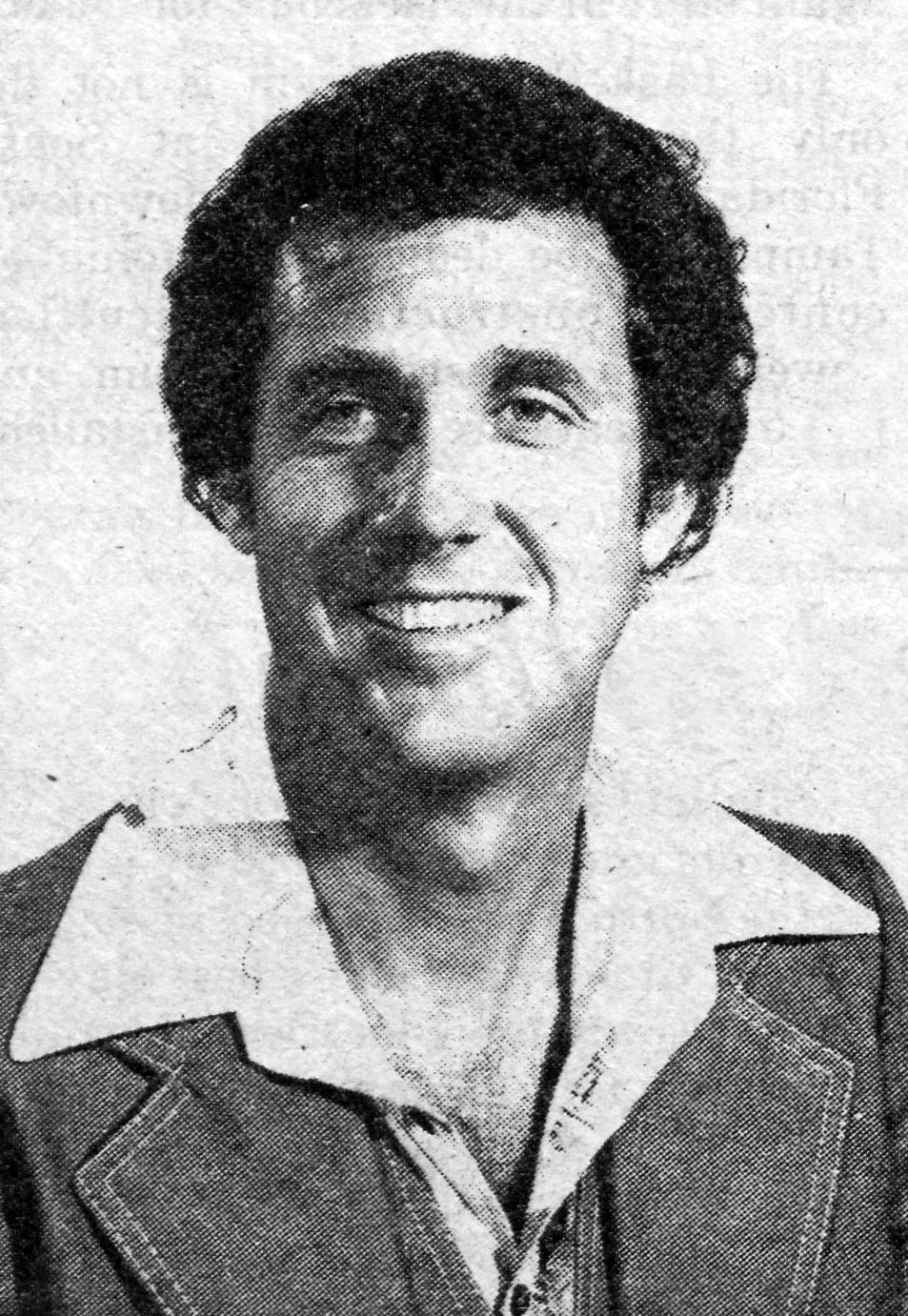
- Foster in 1980

Biographical details
- Born: April 1, 1936; Palatka, Florida, U.S.
- Died: May 27, 2015 (aged 79); Charlotte, North Carolina, U.S.

Playing career
- 1954–1956: Wingate

Coaching career (HC unless noted)
- 1959–1962: Marion HS (SC)
- 1962–1967: Shorter
- 1967–1970: The Citadel (assistant)
- 1970–1975: UNC Charlotte
- 1975–1984: Clemson
- 1985–1990: Miami (FL)
- 1991–1997: Virginia Tech

Head coaching record
- Overall: 533–324 (college)
- Tournaments: 4–2 (NCAA Division I); 6–3 (NIT)

Accomplishments and honors

Championships
- NIT (1995)

William Carey Foster (April 1, 1936 – May 27, 2015) was an American college basketball coach who won over 500 games during a career that spanned 30 years. Foster, a native of Palatka, Florida, compiled an overall record of 532–325 in 30 seasons. He succeeded Tates Locke at Clemson University on April 9, 1975. Foster died of Parkinson's disease in Charlotte, North Carolina on May 27, 2015.

He was one of two men's basketball head coaches named Bill Foster in the Atlantic Coast Conference from 1975 to 1980. The other was at Duke University. Neither were related to each other. Nicknames were used to differentiate the two, with the Tigers coach referred to as Clem Foster and the other as Duke Foster.

== Head coaching record ==
=== College ===
Record table
Season	Team	Overall	Conference	Standing	Postseason
Shorter Hawks () (1962–1967)
1962–63	Shorter	16–8			
1963–64	Shorter	22–5			
1964–65	Shorter	26–5			
1965–66	Shorter	24–6			
1966–67	Shorter	22–9			
Shorter:		110–31			
Charlotte 49ers (NCAA University Division / Division I independent) (1970–1975)
1970–71	Charlotte	15–8			
1971–72	Charlotte	14–11			
1972–73	Charlotte	14–12			
1973–74	Charlotte	22–4			
1974–75	Charlotte	23–3			
Charlotte:		88–38			
Clemson Tigers (Atlantic Coast Conference) (1975–1984)
1975–76	Clemson	18–10	5–7	4th	
1976–77	Clemson	22–6	8–4	T–2nd	
1977–78	Clemson	15–12	3–9	T–6th	
1978–79	Clemson	19–10	5–7	5th	NIT Second Round
1979–80	Clemson	23–9	8–6	4th	NCAA Division I Elite Eight
1980–81	Clemson	20–11	6–8	T–5th	NIT First Round
1981–82	Clemson	14–14	4–10	T–6th	NIT First Round
1982–83	Clemson	11–20	2–12	8th	
1983–84	Clemson	14–14	3–11	8th	
Clemson:		156–106	44–74		
Miami Hurricanes (NCAA Division I independent) (1985–1990)
1985–86	Miami	14–14			
1986–87	Miami	15–16			
1987–88	Miami	17–14			
1988–89	Miami	19–12			
1989–90	Miami	13–15			
Miami:		78–71			
Virginia Tech Hokies (Metro Conference) (1991–1995)
1991–92	Virginia Tech	10–18	3–9	7th	
1992–93	Virginia Tech	10–18	1–11	7th	
1993–94	Virginia Tech	18–10	6–6	4th	
1994–95	Virginia Tech	25–10	6–6	T–4th	NIT Champion
Virginia Tech Hokies (Atlantic 10 Conference) (1995–1997)
1995–96	Virginia Tech	23–6	13–3	T–1st (West)	NCAA Division I Second Round
1996–97	Virginia Tech	15–16	7–9	3rd (West)	
Virginia Tech:		101–78	36–44		
Total:		533–324			
National champion Postseason invitational champion Conference regular season champion Conference regular season and conference tournament champion Division regular season champion Division regular season and conference tournament champion Conference tournament champion
