= Mike Pratt (basketball) =

American basketball player and coach (1948–2022)

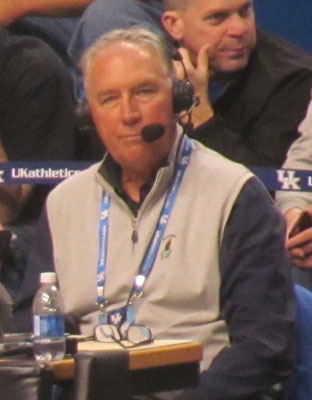
- Pratt providing commentary for a Kentucky scrimmage in 2015

Personal information
- Born: August 4, 1948 Dayton, Ohio, U.S.
- Died: June 16, 2022 (aged 73) Lexington, Kentucky U.S.
- Listed height: 6 ft 4 in (1.93 m)
- Listed weight: 195 lb (88 kg)

Career information
- High school: Meadowdale (Dayton, Ohio)
- College: Kentucky (1967–1970)
- NBA draft: 1970: undrafted
- Position: Shooting guard
- Number: 54, 33

Career history

Playing
- 1970–1972: Kentucky Colonels

Coaching
- 1975–1978: Charlotte (assistant)
- 1978–1982: Charlotte

Career highlights
- 2× First-team All-SEC (1969, 1970)
- Stats at Basketball Reference

Michael P. Pratt (August 4, 1948 – June 16, 2022) was an American basketball player and coach. He was a 6-foot-4-inch (1.93 m), 195 pounds (88 kg) guard.

Born in Dayton, Ohio, Pratt attended Meadowdale High School, graduating in 1966. He then went on to the University of Kentucky where he was a three-year letter winner under legendary coach Adolph Rupp from 1967 through 1970. (Note: The NCAA did not allow freshmen (first-year students) to play on varsity teams in men's basketball until the 1972–73 season.) Following his career with the Wildcats he was selected in the 1970 American Basketball Association draft by the Kentucky Colonels, where he played two seasons and averaged six points per game.

Following his playing days he became an assistant coach under Lee Rose at UNC Charlotte (now known athletically as Charlotte), helping the 49ers to reach the 1977 NCAA Final Four. After Rose accepted the head coaching job at Purdue following the 1977–78 season, Pratt was chosen as his successor. Pratt coached the 49ers for four seasons, compiling a record of 56–52 before being relieved of his duties following the 1981–82 season.

Pratt did analysis on radio broadcasts of Kentucky men's basketball games. In 2009, he was inducted into the University of Kentucky Athletics Hall of Fame.

== Head coaching record ==
Record table
Season	Team	Overall	Conference	Standing	Postseason
Charlotte 49ers (Sun Belt Conference) (1978–1982)
1978–79	Charlotte	16–11	6–4	2nd	
1979–80	Charlotte	15–12	9–5	4th	
1980–81	Charlotte	10–17	3–9	6th	
1981–82	Charlotte	15–12	3–7	5th	
Charlotte:		56–52	21–25		
Total:		56–52			
