= Harvey Murphy (basketball) =

American basketball coach (1930–2018)

Harvey Murphy (September 30, 1930 – February 5, 2018) was a physical education teacher at the University of North Carolina at Charlotte. After being appointed the head of the new university's physical education program by acting chancellor Bonnie Cone, Murphy served as the school's first-ever basketball coach from 1965 until 1970. During his tenure, the 49ers won the Dixie Conference championship in 1969 and 1970.

== Head coaching record ==
Statistics overview
Season	Team	Overall	Conference	Standing	Postseason
UNC Charlotte 49ers (Dixie Conference) (1965–1970)
1965–66	UNC Charlotte	6–17	4–6	4th	
1966–67	UNC Charlotte	7–21	7–5	3rd	
1967–68	UNC Charlotte	5–17	3–9	6th	
1968–69	UNC Charlotte	12–10	9–5	T-2nd	
1969–70	UNC Charlotte	14–16	10–4	T-2nd	NAIA District Playoffs
Total:		44–71			
National champion Postseason invitational champion Conference regular season champion Conference regular season and conference tournament champion Division regular season champion Division regular season and conference tournament champion Conference tournament champion
