= Leemire Goldwire =

American basketball player

Personal information
- Born: November 24, 1985 (age 40) Palm Beach Gardens, Florida
- Listed height: 6 ft 1 in (1.85 m)
- Listed weight: 193 lb (88 kg)

Career information
- High school: William T. Dwyer (Palm Beach Gardens, Florida)
- College: Charlotte 49ers (2004–2008)
- NBA draft: 2008: undrafted
- Playing career: 2008–2019
- Position: Point guard
- Number: 12

Career history
- 2008: Aigaleo
- 2008–2009: Lukoil Academic
- 2009–2011: Sioux Falls Skyforce
- 2011: Fulgor Libertas Forlì
- 2011–2012: Brescia Leonessa
- 2013: Rabotnički
- 2013–2014: Aurora Jesi
- 2014: Sidigas Avellino
- 2014–2015: Melikşah Üniversitesi
- 2015–2016: Eskişehir
- 2016–2017: Akhisar Belediyespor
- 2017–2018: Regatas Corrientes
- 2017–2018: Aguacateros de Michoacán
- 2019: Defensor

Leemire LaTray Goldwire (born November 24, 1985) is an American former professional basketball player.

== Professional career ==
Goldwire joined the Macedonian League club Rabotnički, in 2013. He signed with the Argentine League club Regatas Corrientes in 2017.

== Personal life ==
Goldmire's cousin Anthony, was also a professional basketball player, and he played in the NBA.
