= American Conference Men's Basketball Coach of the Year =

- Awarded for: the most outstanding basketball coach in the American Conference
- Country: United States

History
- First award: 2014
- Most recent: Bryan Hodgson, South Florida

The American Conference Men's Basketball Coach of the Year is a basketball award given to the American Conference's most outstanding head coach. The NCAA Division I conference formed in 2013–14 after many schools departed from the original Big East Conference to form their own conference. The conference was called the American Athletic Conference from its inception up until July 21, 2025, at which time it was formally rebranded. Houston's Kelvin Sampson has four awards, the most all-time and twice that of the second-highest winner Fran Dunphy of Temple, who has two.

== Key ==
*	Awarded at least one of the following major national coach of the year awards that same season: AP, ARC, BT, CBS/C, N, NABC, TSN, USBWA, UPI
Coach (X)	Denotes the number of times the coach had been awarded the American Coach of the Year award at that point
OW, OL, OW %	Overall wins, overall losses, overall win percentage
CW, CL, CW %, CS	Conference wins, conference losses, conference win percentage, conference regular season standing (T=tie)
Finish	National postseason tournament result

== Winners ==
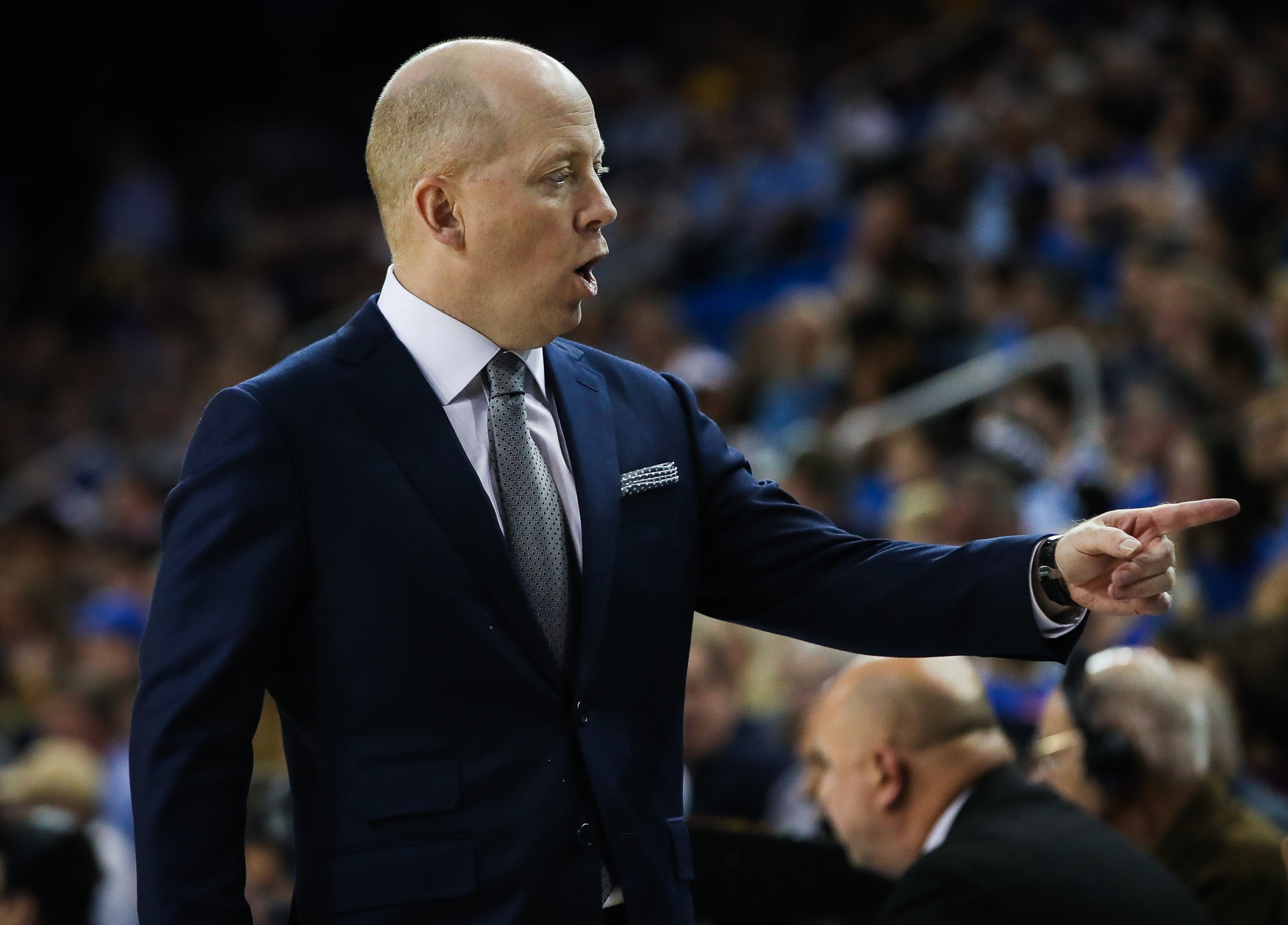
Mick Cronin, Cincinnati, 2014

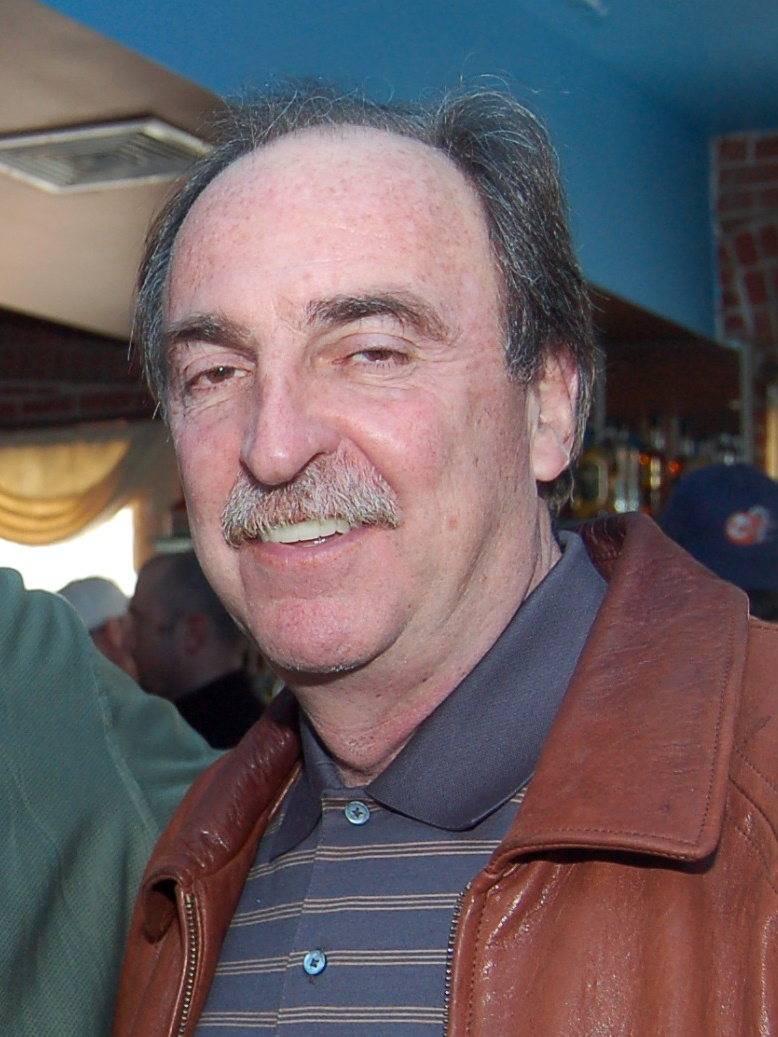
Fran Dunphy, Temple, 2015 and 2016

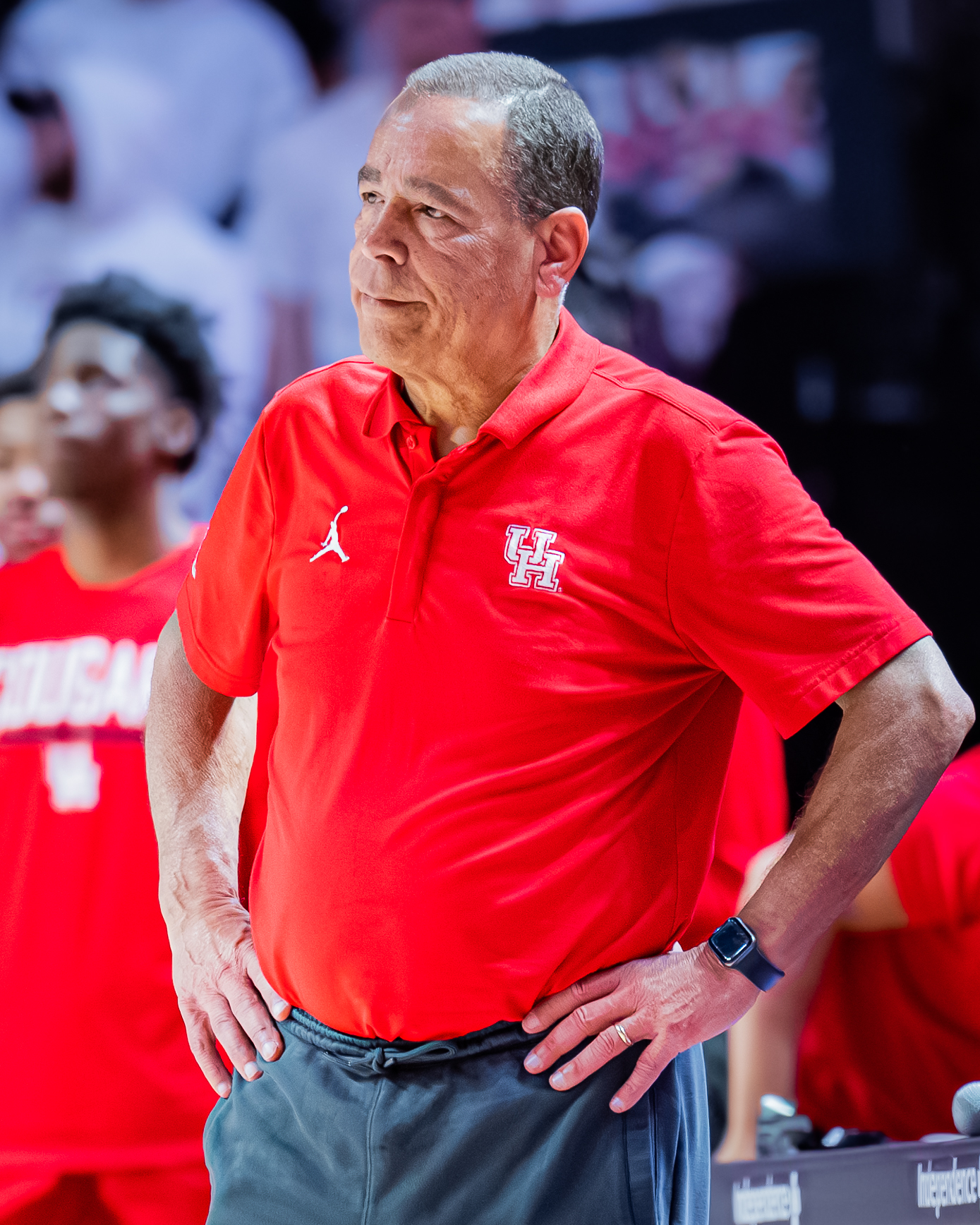
Kelvin Sampson, Houston, 4× winner

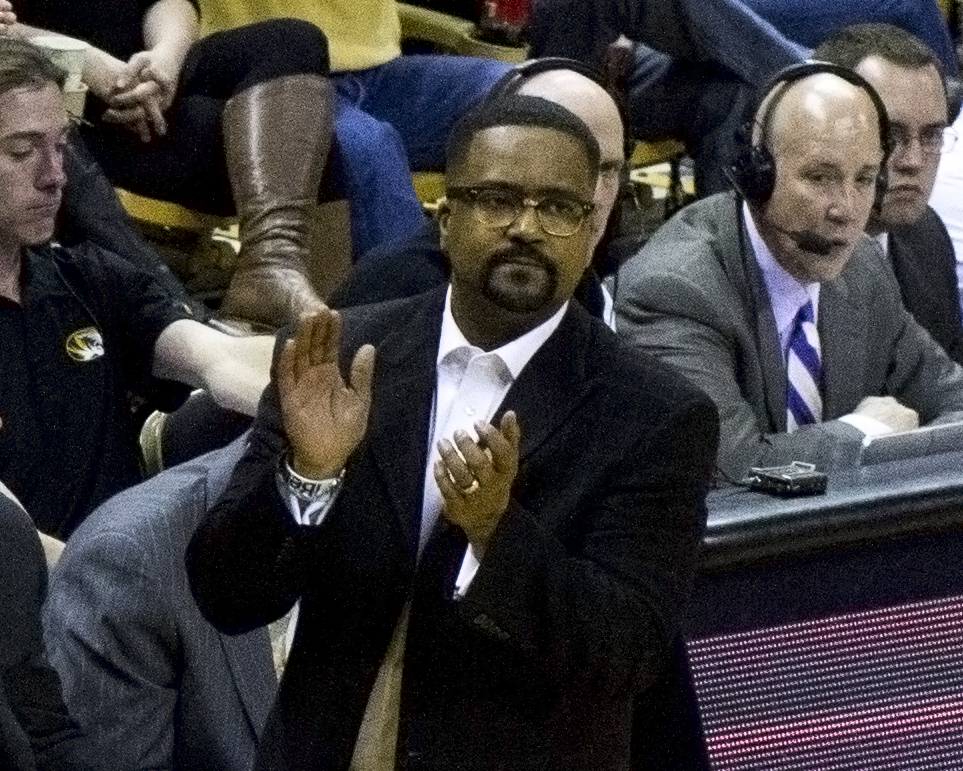
Frank Haith, Tulsa, 2020

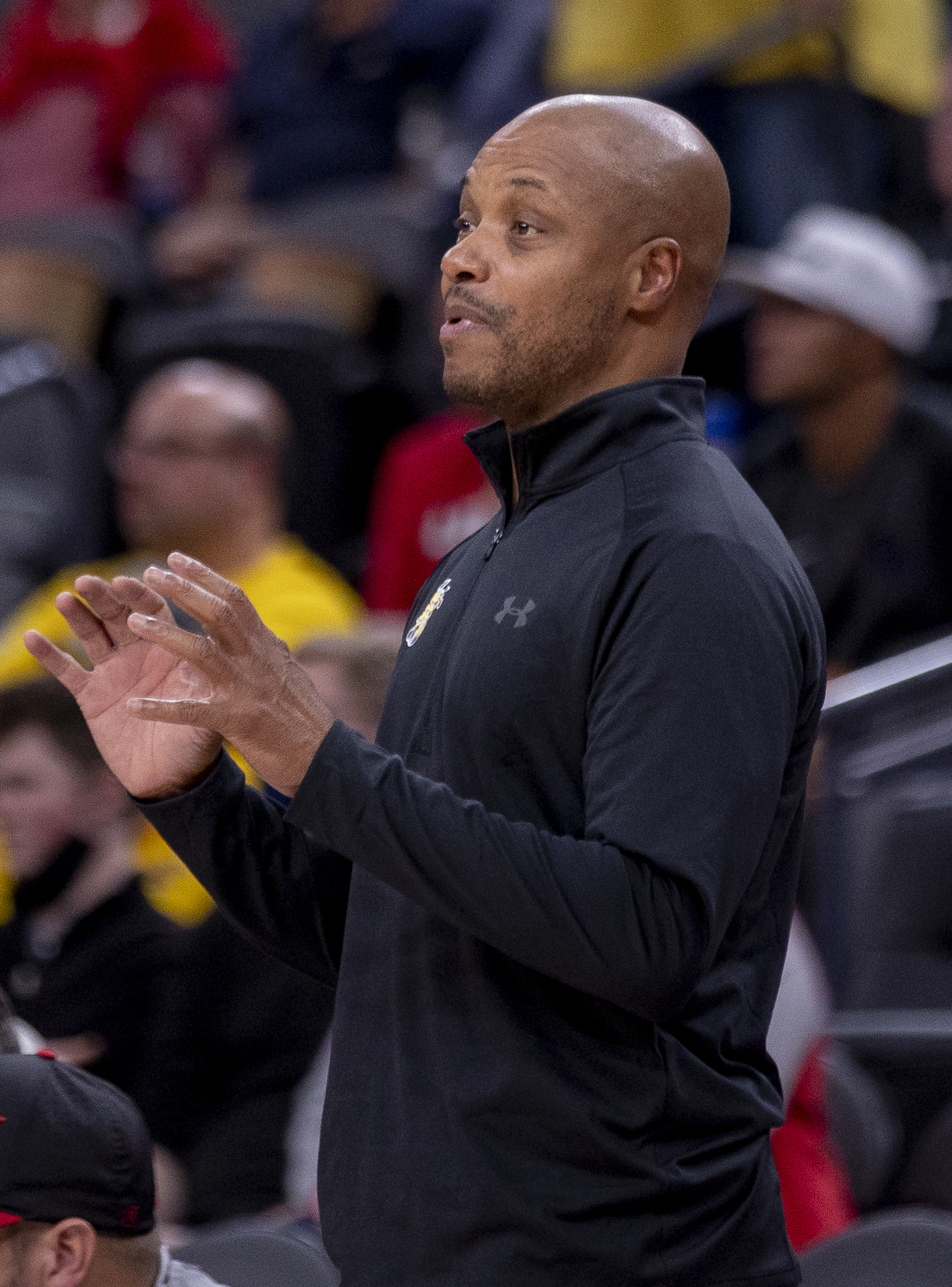
Isaac Brown, Wichita State, 2021

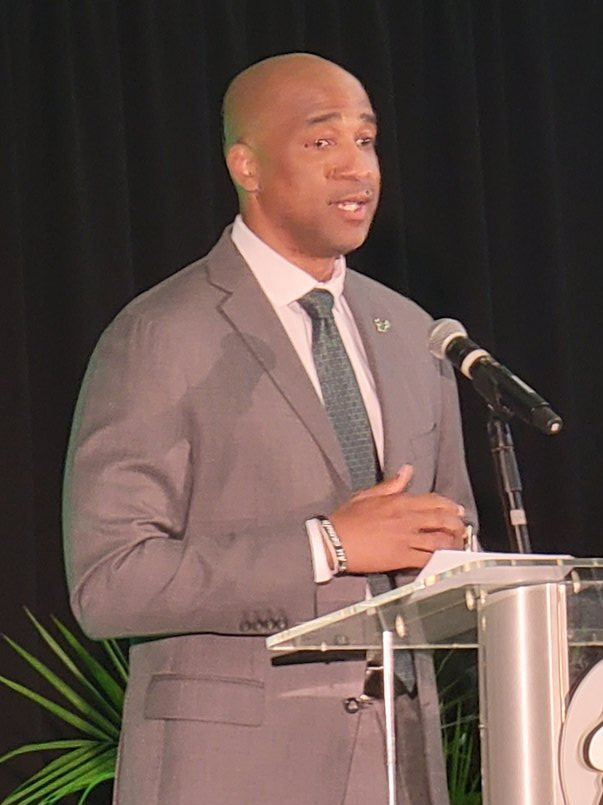
Amir Abdur-Rahim, South Florida, 2024

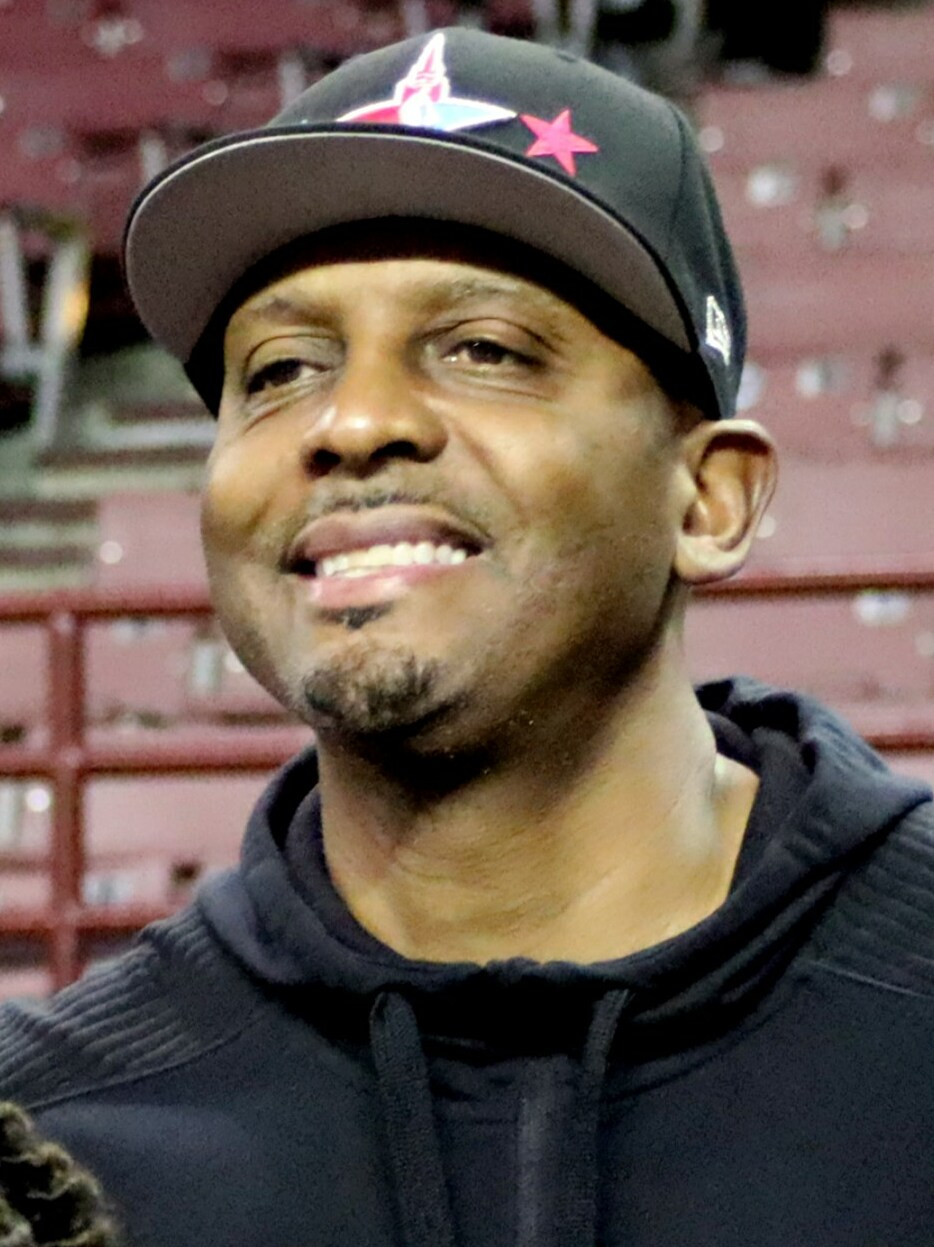
Penny Hardaway, Memphis, 2025

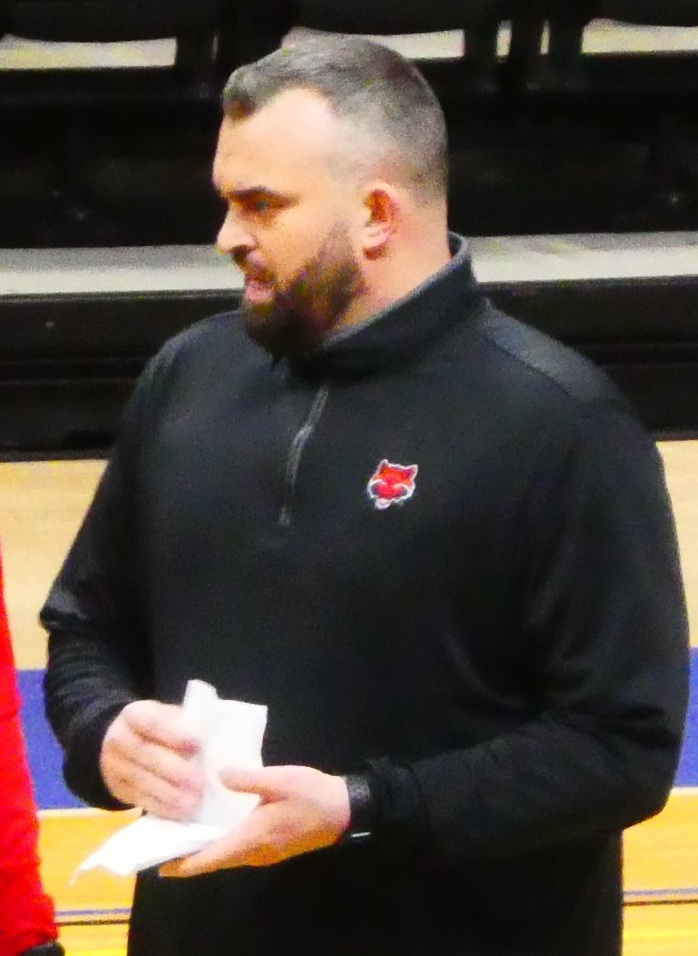
Bryan Hodgson, South Florida, 2026

Season	Coach	School	OW	OL	OW %	CW	CL	CW %	CS	Finish	Reference
2013–14	Mick Cronin	Cincinnati	27	7	.794	15	3	.833	1st^{T}	NCAA round of 64	
2014–15	Fran Dunphy	Temple	26	11	.703	13	5	.722	3rd^{T}	NIT semifinals	
2015–16	Fran Dunphy (2)	Temple	21	12	.636	14	4	.778	1st	NCAA round of 64	
2016–17	Tim Jankovich	SMU	30	5	.857	17	1	.944	1st	NCAA round of 64	
2017–18	Kelvin Sampson	Houston	27	8	.771	14	4	.778	2nd^{T}	NCAA round of 32	
2018–19	Kelvin Sampson (2)	Houston	33	4	.892	16	2	.889	1st	NCAA Sweet Sixteen	
2019–20	Frank Haith	Tulsa	21	10	.677	13	5	.722	1st^{T}	N/A^{[a]}	
2020–21	Isaac Brown	Wichita State	16^{[b]}	6^{[b]}	.727	11^{[b]}	2^{[b]}	.846	1st	NCAA First Four	
2021–22	Kelvin Sampson (3)	Houston	32	6	.842	15	3	.833	1st	NCAA Elite Eight	
2022–23	Kelvin Sampson (4)	Houston	33	4	.892	17	1	.944	1st	NCAA Sweet Sixteen	
2023–24	Amir Abdur-Rahim	South Florida	25	8	.758	16	2	.889	1st	NIT second round	
2024–25	Penny Hardaway^{[c]}	Memphis	29	6	.829	16	2	.889	1st	NCAA round of 64	
2025–26	Bryan Hodgson	South Florida	25	9	.735	15	3	.833	1st	NCAA round of 64	

- ^{a} The COVID-19 pandemic caused the 2019–20 season to be canceled prior to any national postseason tournaments occurring.
- ^{b} The NCAA capped the 2020–21 regular season maximum at 27 games. Wichita State withdrew from its season-opening tournament in late November 2020 due to a COVID-19 outbreak, and some individual conference games were postponed or adjusted, though they still played a full conference and postseason slate.
- ^{c} An honorary award was also presented posthumously to Amir Abdur-Rahim of South Florida, who died shortly before the start of the 2024–25 season.

== Winners by school ==
In this table, the "year joined" reflects the calendar year when each school joined the conference. The "Years" column reflects the calendar year in which each award was presented.

School (year joined)	Winners	Years
Houston (2013) (Note: Cincinnati, Houston, and UCF left The American after the 2022–23 season to join the current Big 12 Conference.)	4	2018, 2019, 2022, 2023
South Florida (2013)	2	2024, 2026
Temple (2013)	2	2015, 2016
Cincinnati (2013)	1	2014
Memphis (2013)	1	2025
SMU (2013)	1	2017
Tulsa (2014)	1	2020
Wichita State (2017)	1	2021
East Carolina (2014)	0	—
Louisville (2013) (Note: Louisville and Rutgers played only the 2013–14 season in the American. In July 2014, they respectively left for the ACC and Big Ten.)	0	—
Rutgers (2013)	0	—
Tulane (2014)	0	—
UCF (2013)	0	—
UConn (2013) (Note: UConn left the American after the 2019–20 season to join the current Big East Conference.)	0	—
