= Big 12 Conference Men's Basketball Coach of the Year =

Annual basketball award

Big 12 Men's Basketball Coach of the Year
- Awarded for: the most outstanding basketball head coach in the Big 12 Conference
- Country: United States
- Presented by: Phillips 66

History
- First award: 1997
- Most recent: Tommy Lloyd, Arizona

The Big 12 Conference Men's Basketball Coach of the Year is a basketball award given to the Big 12 Conference's most outstanding coach. The official award is chosen by the Big 12's head coaches, who are not allowed to vote for themselves. The Associated Press also has their own vote by a panel of national sportswriters but their award is not officially recognized in the league's record book.

It was first given following the 1996–97 season, the first year of the conference's existence, to Kansas Jayhawks head coach Roy Williams.

Through 2026, current Kansas head coach Bill Self has won the award a league-leading six times. The only Big 12 Coach of the Year to have won the national championship in the same season was Scott Drew, who led Baylor to the title in 2021.

Kansas has the most all-time winners with eight, while Texas is next with four. Kansas State has the most individual recipients of the award with three. The only pre-2023 members that have never had a coach win are Colorado, which left the Big 12 in 2011 but returned in 2024, and TCU, a member since 2012.

== Key ==
*	Awarded at least one of the following major national coach of the year awards that same season: AP, ARC, BT, CBS/C, N, NABC, TSN, USBWA, UPI
Coach (X)	Denotes the number of times the coach had been awarded the Big 12 Coach of the Year award at that point
†	Co-Coaches of the Year
OW, OL, OW %	Overall wins, overall losses, overall win percentage
CW, CL, CW %, CS	Conference wins, conference losses, conference win percentage, conference regular season standing (T=tie)
Finish	National postseason tournament result
C	Denotes national championship season

== Winners ==
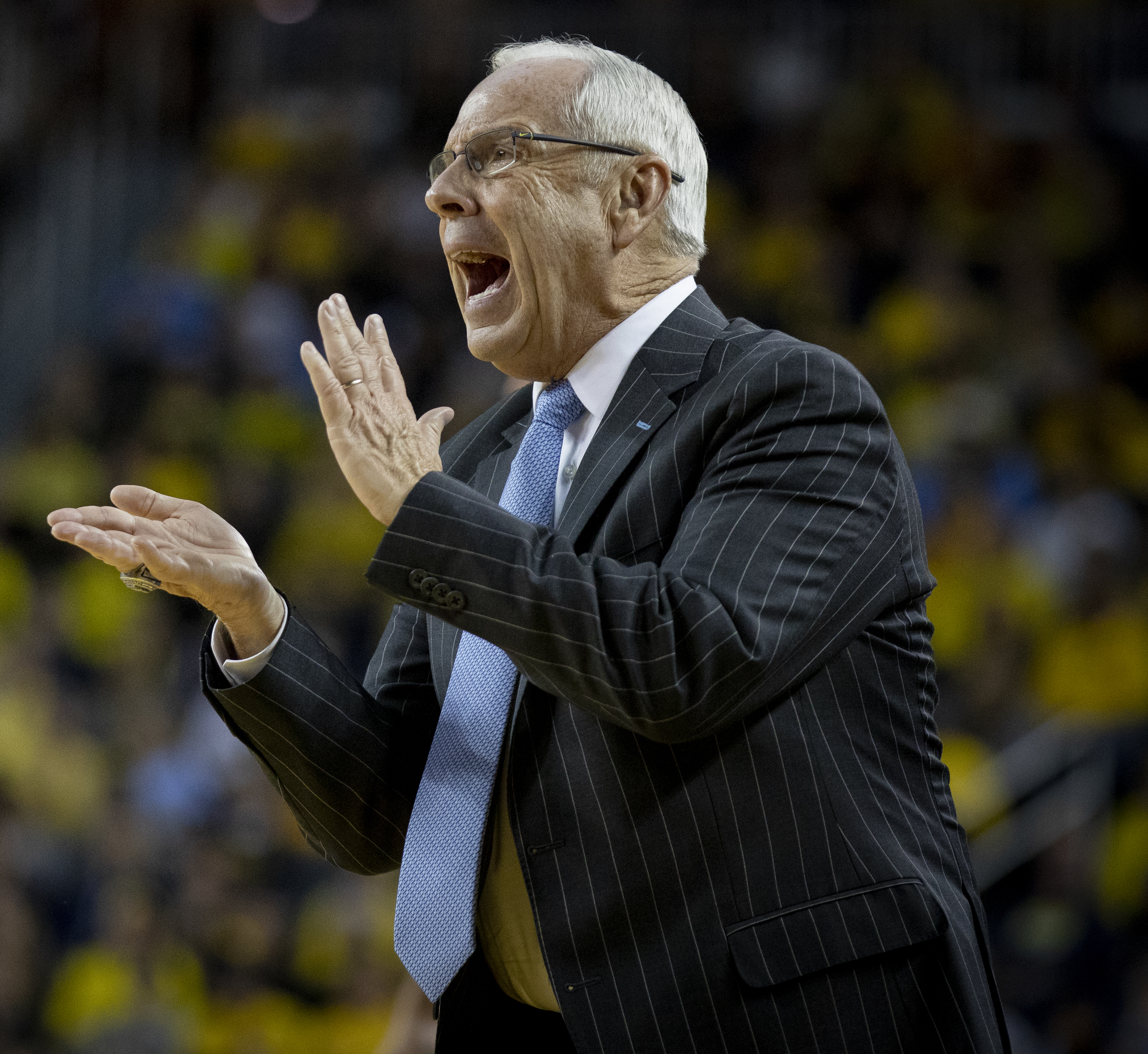
Roy Williams, Kansas, 1997 and 2002

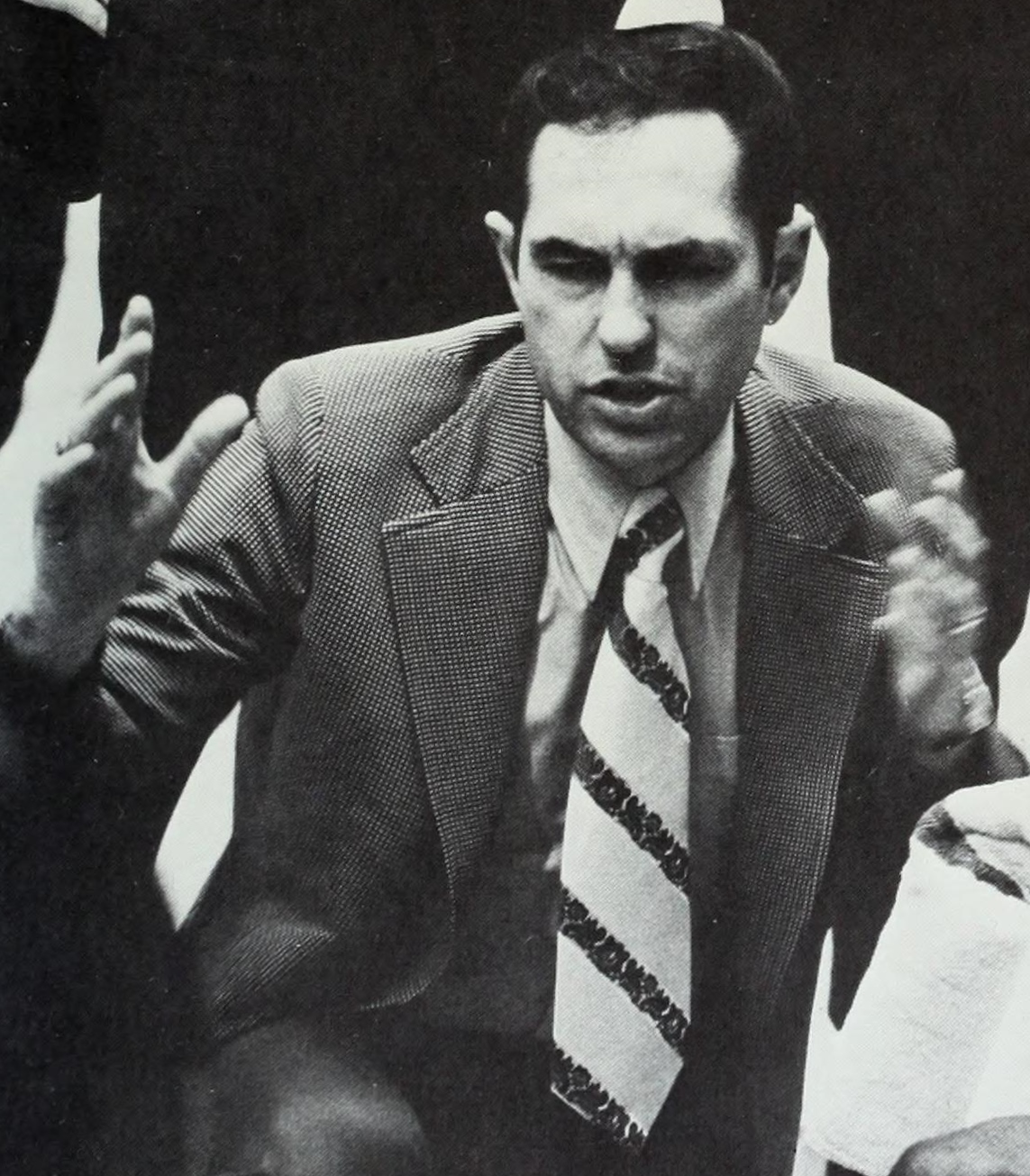
Eddie Sutton, Oklahoma State, 1998 and 2004

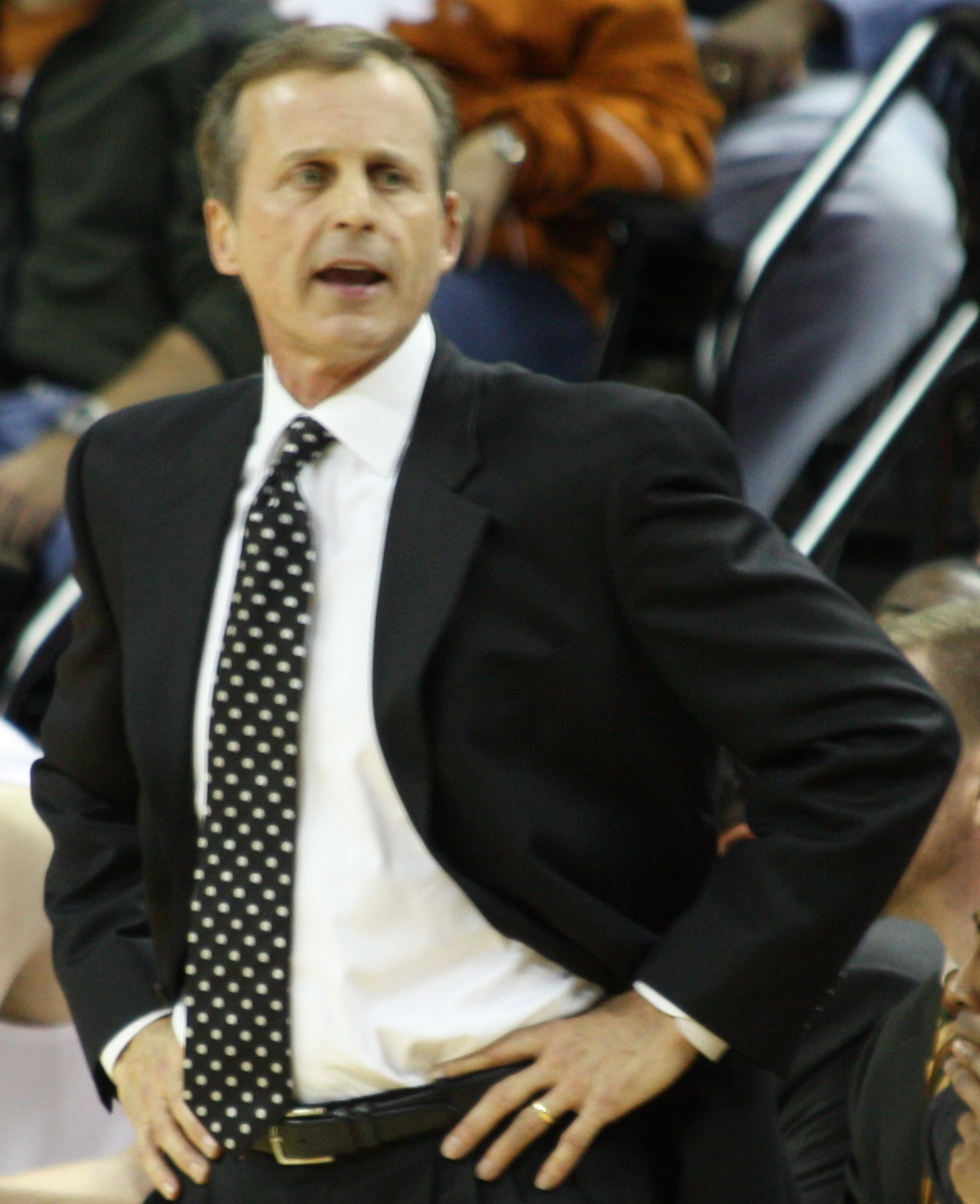
Rick Barnes, 4× winner

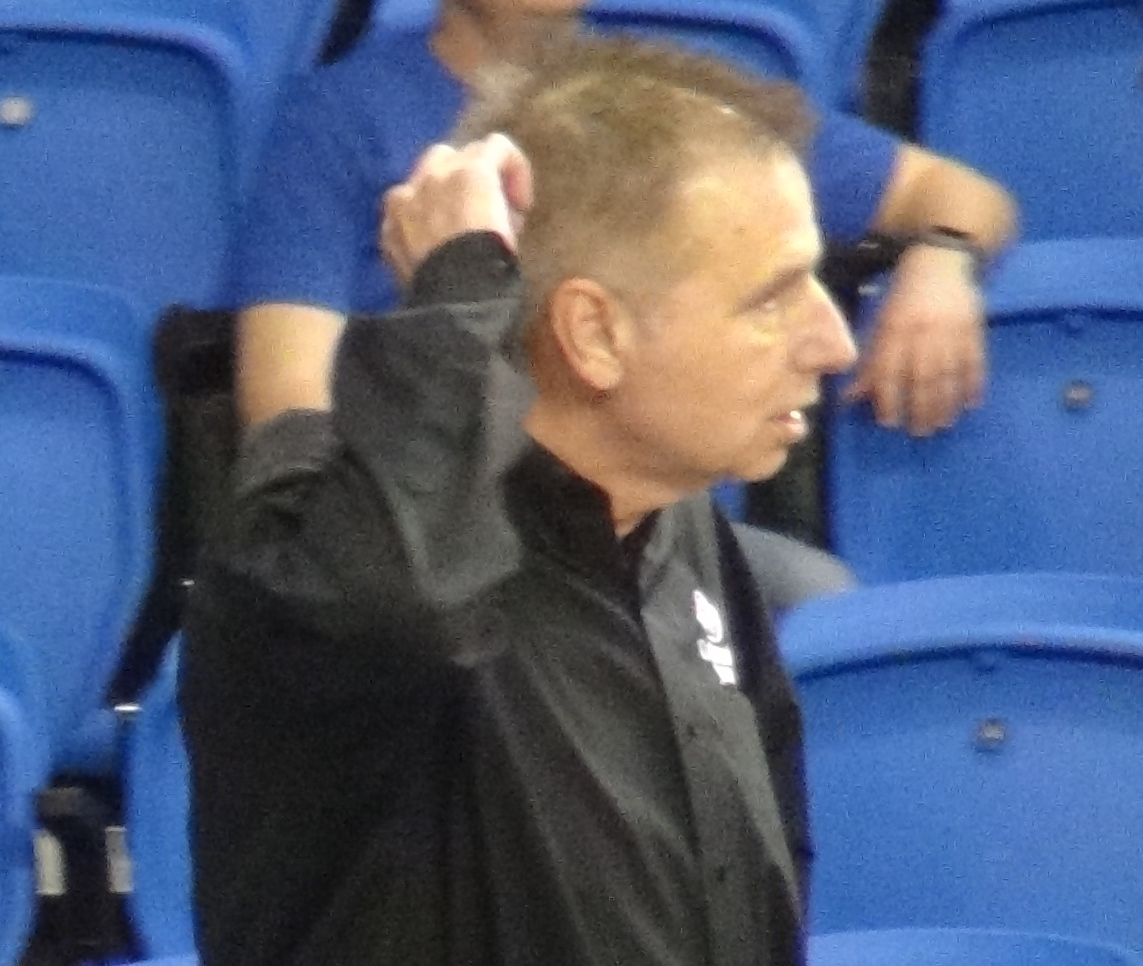
Larry Eustachy, Iowa State, 2000 and 2001

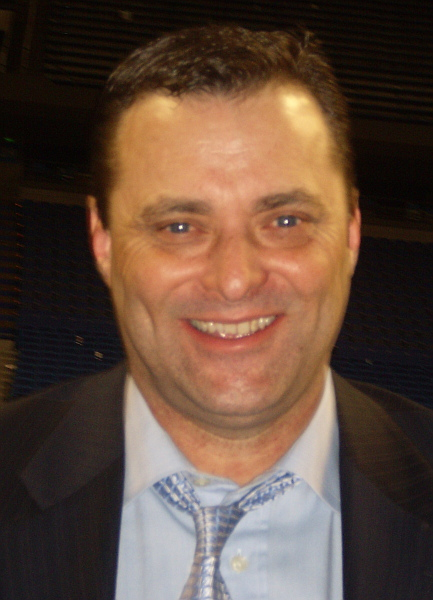
Billy Gillispie, Texas A&M, 2005 and 2007

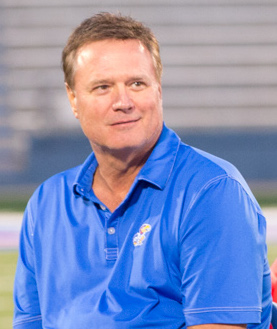
Bill Self, Kansas, 6× winner

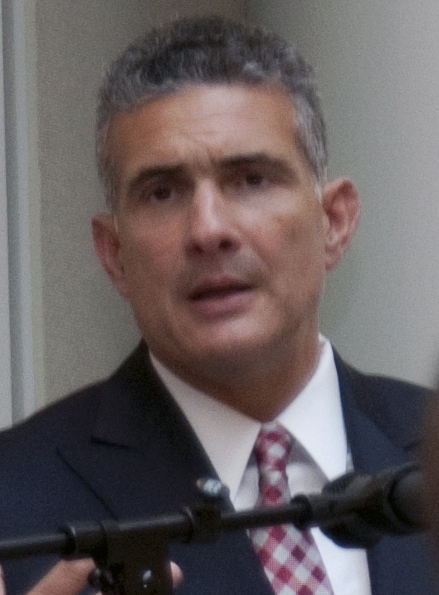
Frank Martin, Kansas State, 2010

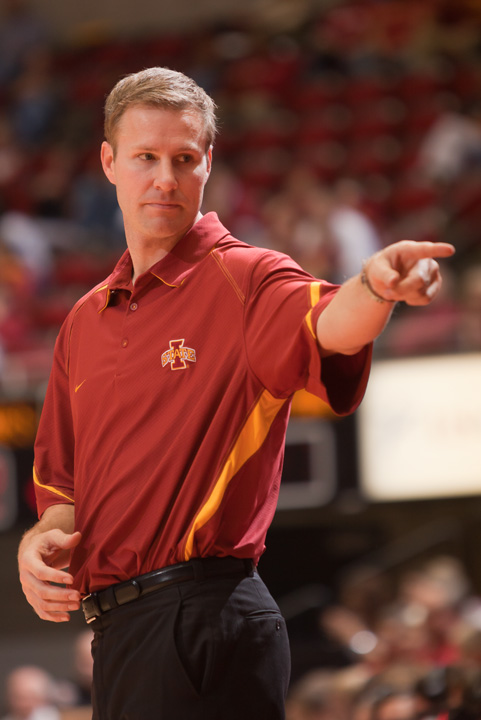
Fred Hoiberg, Iowa State, 2012

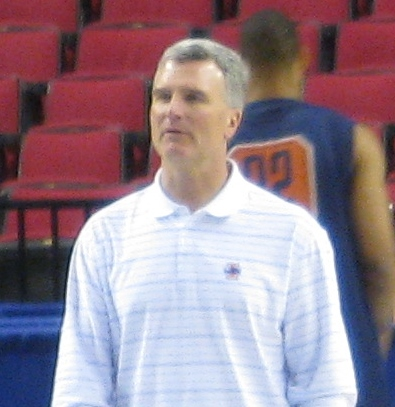
Bruce Weber, Kansas State, 2013

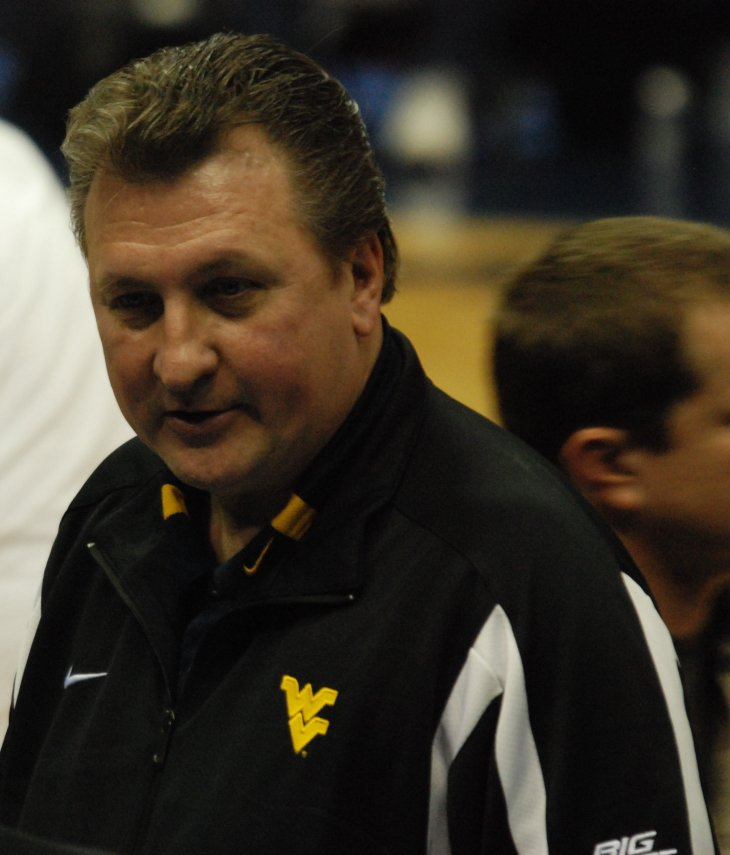
Bob Huggins, West Virginia, 2015

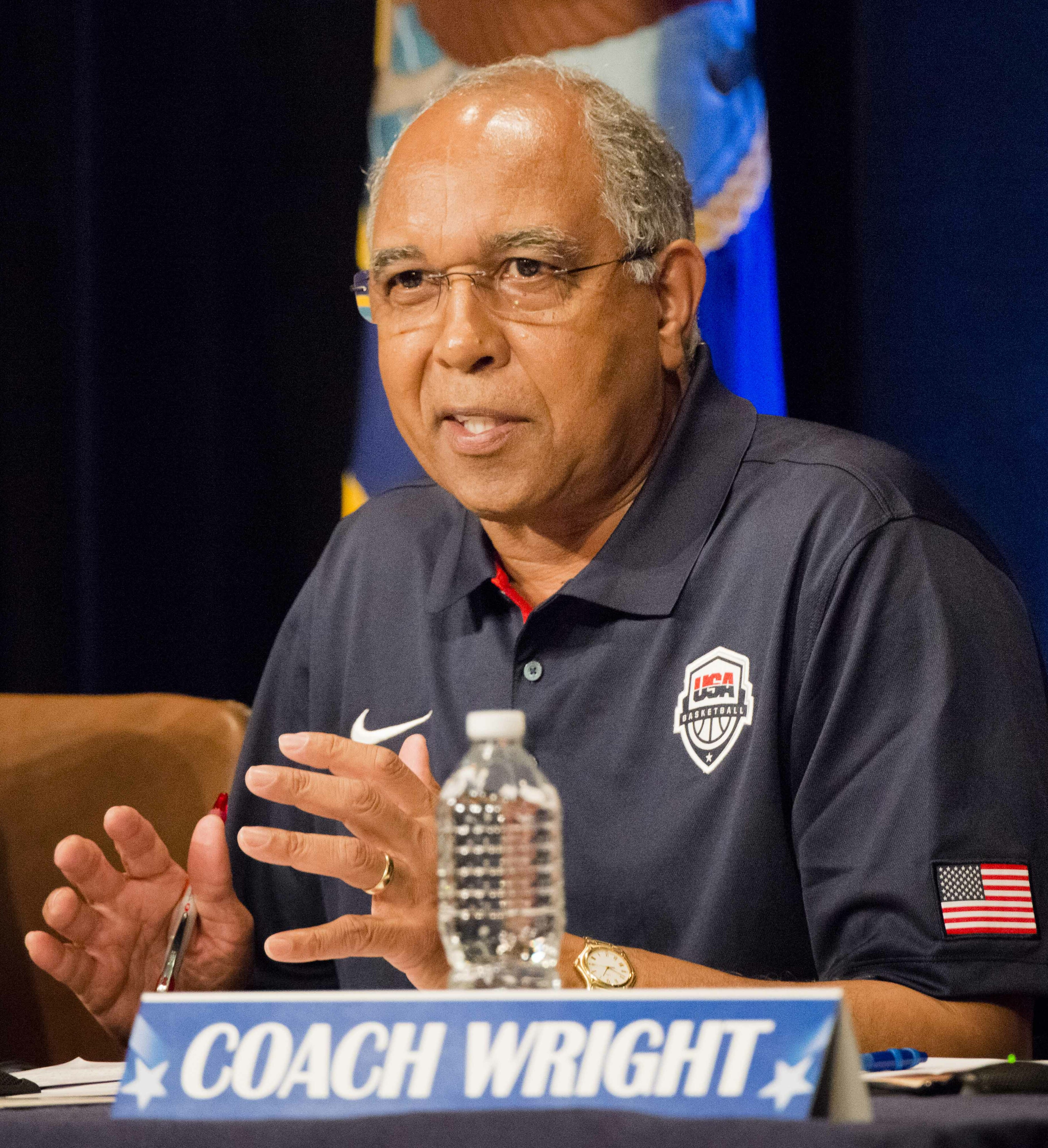
Tubby Smith, Texas Tech, 2016

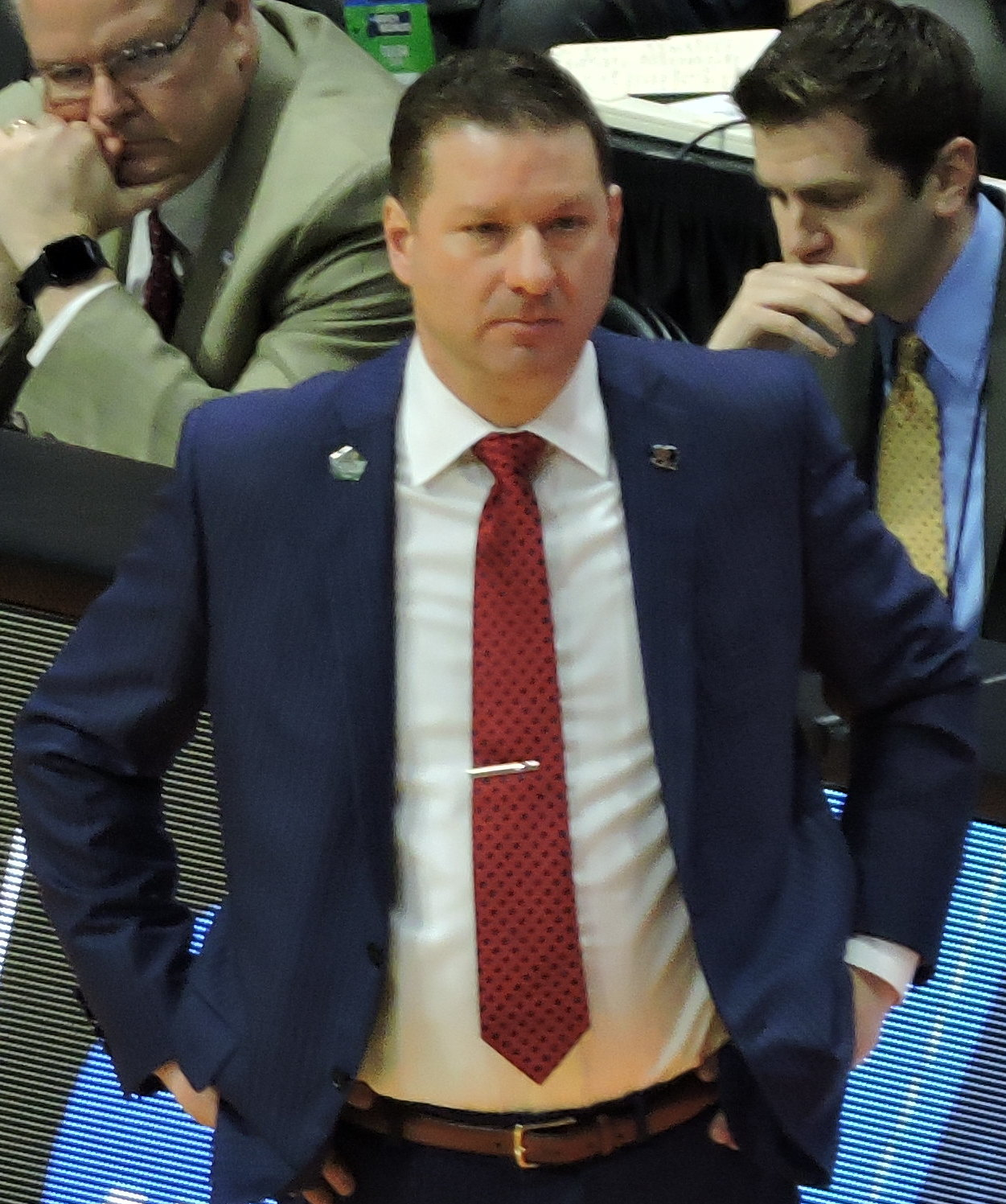
Chris Beard, Texas Tech, 2018 and 2019

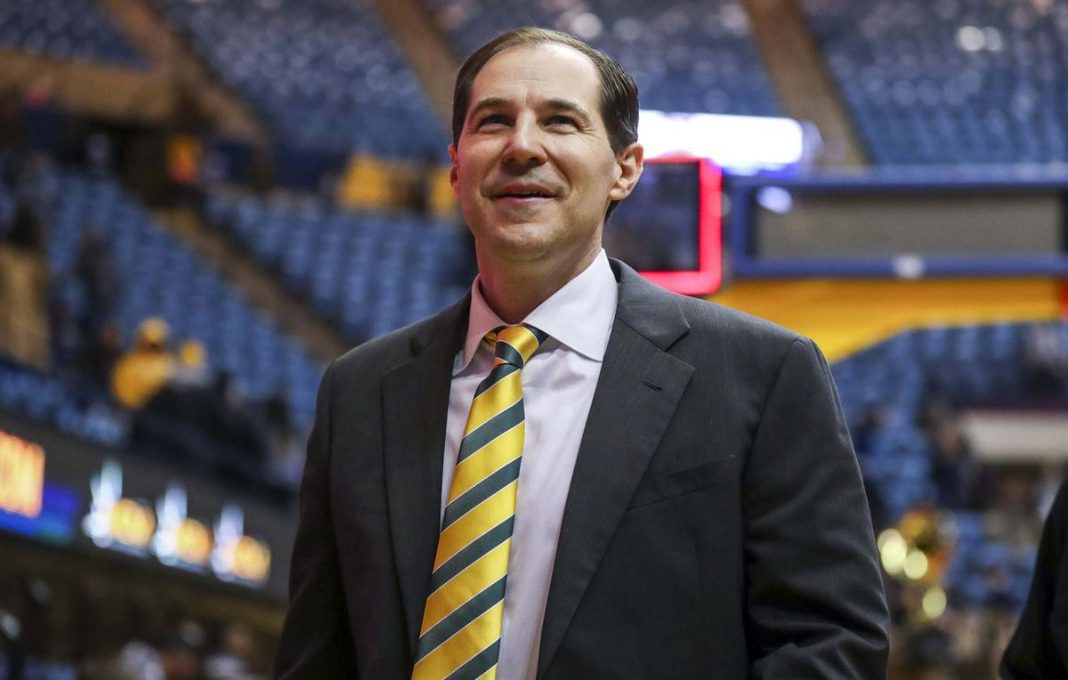
Scott Drew, Baylor, 3× winner

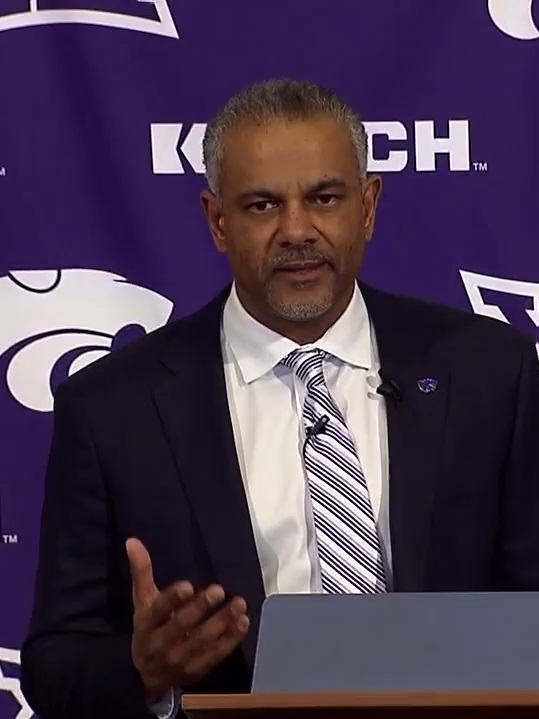
Jerome Tang, Kansas State, 2023

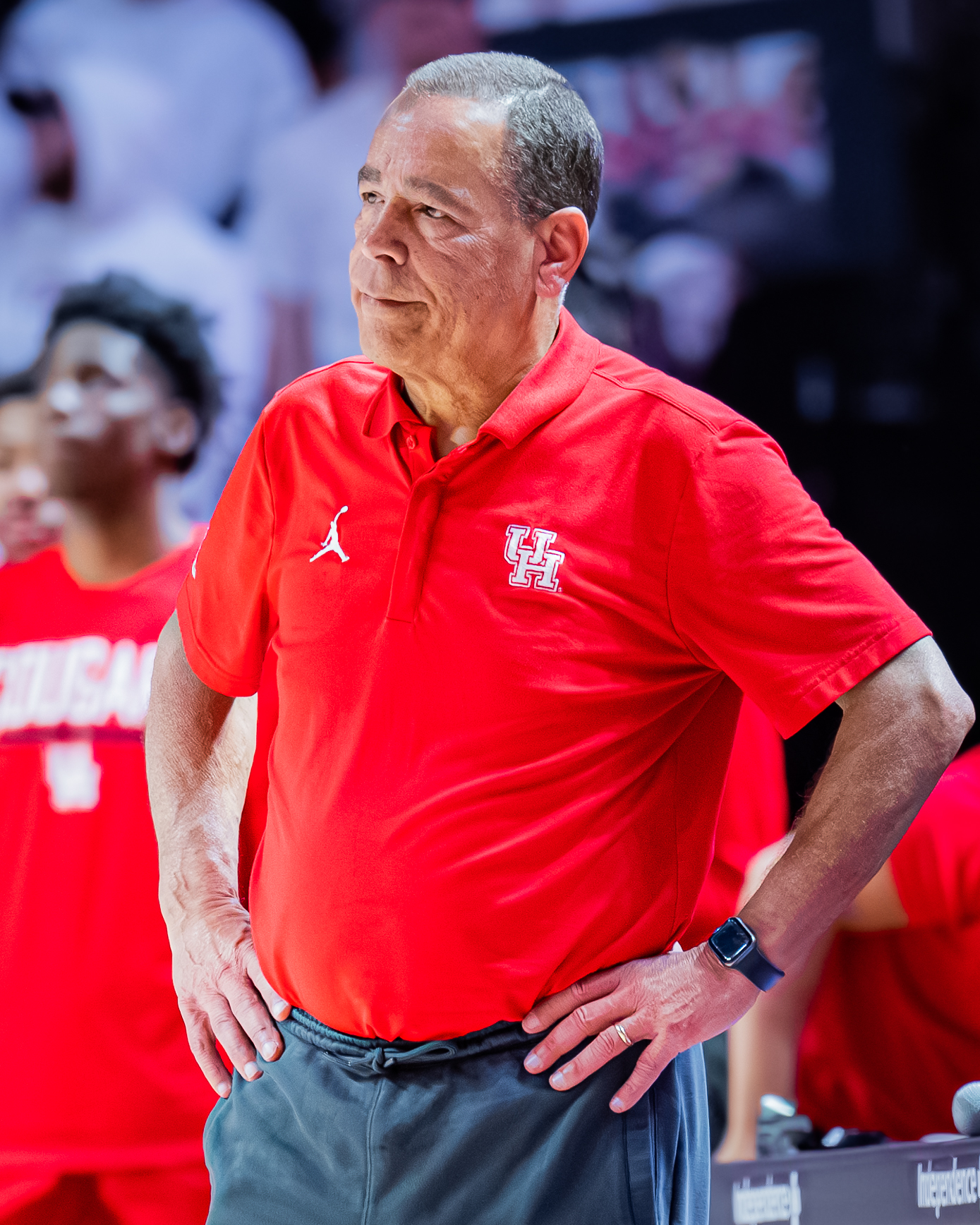
Kelvin Sampson, Houston, 2024 and 2025

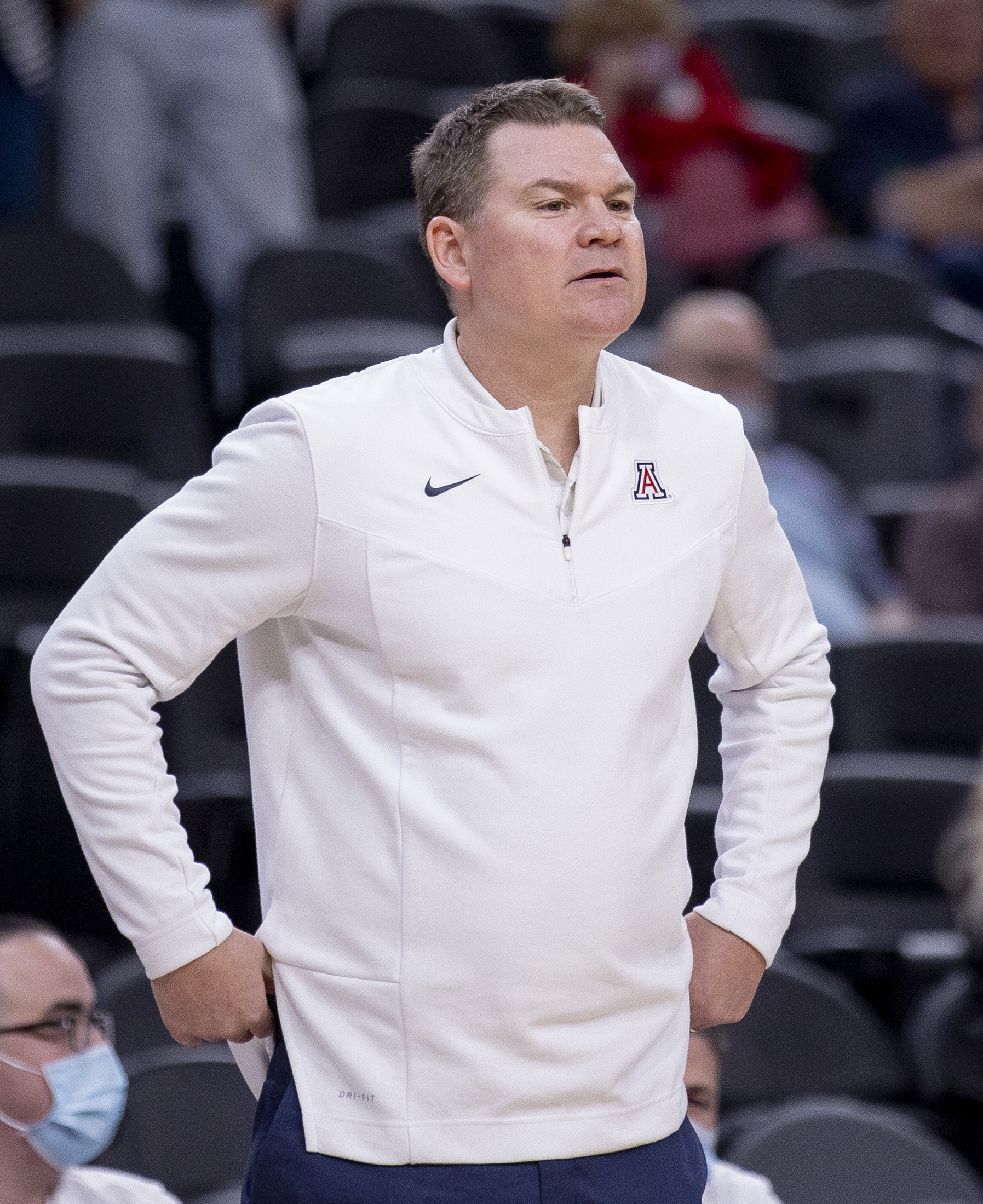
Tommy Lloyd, Arizona, 2026

Season	Coach	School	OW	OL	OW %	CW	CL	CW %	CS	Finish	Reference
1996–97	Roy Williams*	Kansas	34	2	.944	15	1	.938	1st	NCAA Sweet Sixteen	
1997–98	Eddie Sutton	Oklahoma State	22	7	.759	11	5	.688	2nd^{T}	NCAA second round	
1998–99	Rick Barnes	Texas	19	13	.594	13	3	.813	1st	NCAA first round	
1999–00	Larry Eustachy*	Iowa State	32	5	.865	14	2	.875	1st	NCAA Elite Eight	
2000–01	Larry Eustachy (2)	Iowa State	25	6	.806	13	3	.813	1st	NCAA first round	
2001–02	Roy Williams (2)	Kansas	33	4	.892	16	0	1.000	1st	NCAA Final Four	
2002–03	Rick Barnes (2)	Texas	26	7	.788	13	3	.813	2nd	NCAA Final Four	
2003–04	Eddie Sutton (2)	Oklahoma State	31	4	.886	14	2	.875	1st	NCAA Final Four	
2004–05	Billy Gillispie	Texas A&M	21	10	.677	8	8	.500	7th	NIT quarterfinals	
2005–06	Bill Self	Kansas	25	8	.758	13	3	.813	1st^{T}	NCAA first round	
2006–07	Billy Gillispie (2)	Texas A&M	27	7	.794	13	3	.813	2nd	NCAA Sweet Sixteen	
2007–08	Rick Barnes (3)	Texas	31	7	.816	13	3	.813	1st^{T}	NCAA Elite Eight	
2008–09	Bill Self* (2)	Kansas	27	8	.771	14	2	.875	1st	NCAA Sweet Sixteen	
2009–10	Frank Martin	Kansas State	29	8	.784	11	5	.688	2nd^{T}	NCAA Elite Eight	
2010–11	Bill Self (3)	Kansas	35	3	.921	14	2	.875	1st	NCAA Elite Eight	
2011–12^{†}	Fred Hoiberg	Iowa State	23	11	.676	12	6	.667	3rd^{T}	NCAA round of 32^{[a]}	
2011–12^{†}	Bill Self* (4)	Kansas	32	7	.821	16	2	.889	1st	NCAA runners-up	
2012–13	Bruce Weber	Kansas State	27	8	.771	14	4	.778	1st^{T}	NCAA round of 64	
2013–14	Rick Barnes (4)	Texas	24	11	.686	11	7	.611	3rd^{T}	NCAA round of 32	
2014–15	Bob Huggins	West Virginia	25	10	.714	11	7	.611	4th^{T}	NCAA Sweet Sixteen	
2015–16	Tubby Smith*	Texas Tech	19	13	.594	9	9	.500	7th	NCAA round of 64	
2016–17	Bill Self (5)	Kansas	31	5	.861	16	2	.889	1st	NCAA Elite Eight	
2017–18^{†}	Chris Beard	Texas Tech	27	10	.730	11	7	.611	2nd^{T}	NCAA Elite Eight	
2017–18^{†}	Bill Self (6)	Kansas	31^{[b]}	8^{[b]}	.795^{[b]}	13^{[b]}	5^{[b]}	.722^{[b]}	1st^{[b]}	NCAA Final Four^{[b]}	
2018–19	Chris Beard* (2)	Texas Tech	31	7	.816	14	4	.778	1st^{T}	NCAA runners-up	
2019–20	Scott Drew	Baylor	26	4	.867	15	3	.833	2nd	N/A^{[c]}	
2020–21	Scott Drew (2)	Baylor	28	2	.933	13	1	.929	1st	NCAA champion^{C}	
2021–22	Scott Drew (3)	Baylor	27	7	.794	14	4	.778	1st^{T}	NCAA round of 32	
2022–23	Jerome Tang*	Kansas State	26	10	.722	11	7	.611	3rd^{T}	NCAA Elite Eight	
2023–24	Kelvin Sampson*	Houston	32	5	.865	15	3	.833	1st	NCAA Sweet Sixteen	
2024–25	Kelvin Sampson* (2)	Houston	35	5	.875	19	1	.950	1st	NCAA runners-up	
2025–26	Tommy Lloyd*	Arizona	36	3	.923	16	2	.889	1st	NCAA Final Four	

- ^{a} The NCAA men's tournament expanded to 68 teams starting in 2011, with the last four teams earning bids into the tournament set in competition with one another via "First Four" play-in games. The 'first round' then became more commonly referred to as 'round of 64' and the 'second round' as the 'round of 32', for specificity.
- ^{b} In 2023, 15 of the Jayhawks' wins, their conference regular season and tournament championships, their NCAA tournament appearance (and Final Four appearance) were all vacated for recruiting violations. Kansas' adjusted record became 16–8 (2–5 conference).
- ^{c} The COVID-19 pandemic caused the 2019–20 season to be canceled prior to any national postseason tournaments occurring.

== Winners by school ==
School (membership)	Winners	Years
Kansas (1996–present)	8	1997, 2002, 2006, 2009, 2011, 2012^{†}, 2017, 2018^{†}
Texas (1996–2024)	4	1999, 2003, 2008, 2014
Baylor (1996–present)	3	2020, 2021, 2022
Iowa State (1996–present)	3	2000, 2001, 2012^{†}
Kansas State (1996–present)	3	2010, 2013, 2023
Texas Tech (1996–present)	3	2016, 2018^{†}, 2019
Houston (2023–present)	2	2024, 2025
Oklahoma State (1996–present)	2	1998, 2004
Texas A&M (1996–2012)	2	2005, 2007
Arizona (2024–present)	1	2026
West Virginia (2012–present)	1	2015
Arizona State (2024–present)	0	—
BYU (2023–present)	0	—
Cincinnati (2023–present)	0	—
Colorado (1996–2011, 2024–present)	0	—
Missouri (1996–2012)	0	—
Nebraska (1996–2011)	0	—
Oklahoma (1996–2024)	0	—
TCU (2012–present)	0	—
UCF (2023–present)	0	—
Utah (2024–present)	0	—
