= Penny Hardaway =

American basketball player and coach (born 1971)

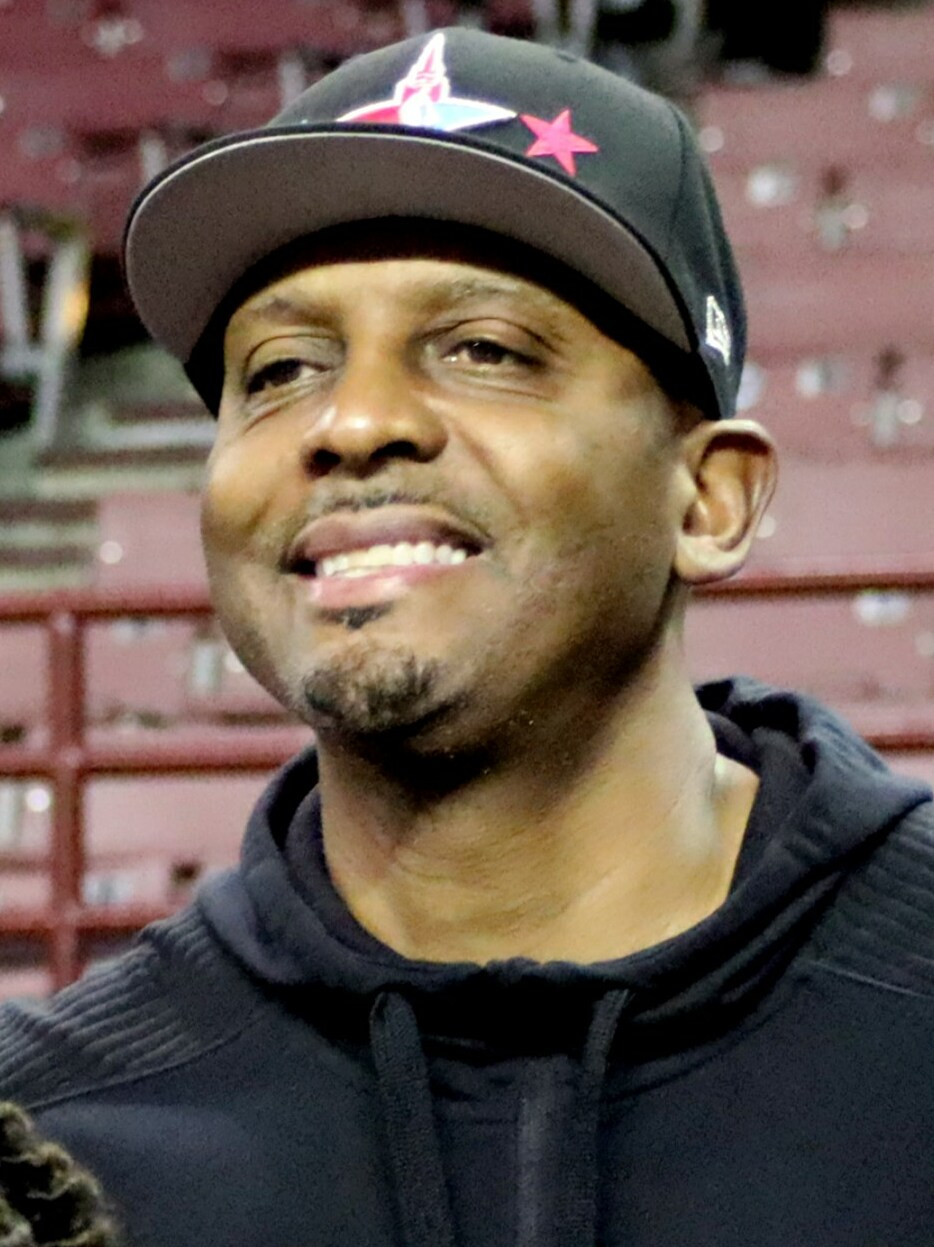
- Hardaway in 2023

Memphis Tigers
- Title: Head coach
- League: American Athletic Conference

Personal information
- Born: July 18, 1971 (age 55) Memphis, Tennessee, U.S.
- Listed height: 6 ft 7 in (2.01 m)
- Listed weight: 215 lb (98 kg)

Career information
- High school: Treadwell (Memphis, Tennessee)
- College: Memphis (1991–1993)
- NBA draft: 1993: 1st round, 3rd overall pick
- Drafted by: Golden State Warriors
- Playing career: 1993–2007
- Position: Point guard / shooting guard
- Number: 25, 1, 7
- Coaching career: 2015–present

Career history

Playing
- 1993–1999: Orlando Magic
- 1999–2004: Phoenix Suns
- 2004–2006: New York Knicks
- 2007: Miami Heat

Coaching
- 2015–2017: East HS (assistant)
- 2017–2018: East HS
- 2018–present: Memphis

Career highlights
- As player: 4× NBA All-Star (1995–1998); 2× All-NBA First Team (1995, 1996); All-NBA Third Team (1997); NBA All-Rookie First Team (1994); Consensus first-team All-American (1993); 2× Great Midwest Player of the Year (1992, 1993); No. 25 retired by Memphis Tigers; First-team Parade All-American (1990); Tennessee Mr. Basketball (1990); As coach: NIT champion (2021); 2× AAC tournament champion (2023, 2025); AAC regular season champion (2025); AAC Coach of the Year (2025)

Career NBA statistics
- Points: 10,684 (15.2 ppg)
- Rebounds: 3,146 (4.5 rpg)
- Assists: 3,525 (5.0 apg)
- Stats at NBA.com
- Stats at Basketball Reference
Medals
Men's basketball
Representing the United States
Olympic Games
Gold medal – first place	1996 Atlanta	Team competition

Anfernee Deon "Penny" Hardaway (born July 18, 1971) is an American college basketball coach and former professional player who is the head coach of the Memphis Tigers men's team in the American Athletic Conference (AAC). Hardaway played college basketball at Memphis and 14 seasons in the National Basketball Association (NBA), where he was a four-time NBA All-Star and a three-time All-NBA Team member as a member of the Orlando Magic. He also played for the Phoenix Suns, New York Knicks, and Miami Heat.

== Early life ==
Hardaway is the son of Fae Hardaway (born 1951) and Eddie Golden. The name Anfernee (/ˈænfərniː/) was that of a schoolmate of his mother. When she left Memphis to work in Oakland in 1974, she left her son with her mother, Louise. His nickname came as a result of his grandmother's calling him "Pretty" with a southern drawl, thus sounding like "Penny". He wore #1 on his jersey in part because a penny is worth one cent. Hardaway's first love was football, but his grandmother did not want him to get hurt. He was raised in the Binghampton neighborhood of shotgun houses in Memphis. As a teenager, Hardaway refereed youth sports at the Memphis YMCA and played on its Jr. Olympic basketball team.

Hardaway played high school basketball at Treadwell High School in Memphis, where he averaged 36.6 points, 10.1 rebounds, 6.2 assists, 3.9 steals, and 2.8 blocks as a senior and was named Parade Magazine National High School player of the year. He finished his high school career with 3,039 points. In 2014, he was inducted into the National High School Hall of Fame.

== College career ==
At Memphis State University (now the University of Memphis), Hardaway had to sit out the 1990–91 season with the Memphis State Tigers due to being academically ineligible according to the Proposition 48 regulation. His grades were so low that he was admitted to the university on a special exemption from University President Thomas G. Carpenter. He took the ACT five times with a maximum score of 17.2, with 17.5 being required to be eligible to play in college.

While he was sitting out, Hardaway was robbed at gunpoint outside his cousin LaMarcus Golden's house and was shot in his foot by a stray bullet, putting his career in jeopardy. He returned to school while rehabbing his foot when the bullet was removed; that year, he made the Dean's List.

In the summer of 1992 Hardaway was selected to the 1992 USA Basketball Developmental Team that scrimmaged daily against the 1992 Olympic Team. Hardaway was teammates with Chris Webber, Bobby Hurley, Jamal Mashburn, Rodney Rogers, Eric Montross, Grant Hill, and Allan Houston.

Hardaway returned for his junior season (1992–93) and bettered his numbers from the previous season. He averaged 22.8 ppg, 8.5 rpg, 6.4 apg, 2.4 spg, and 1.2 bpg. He accumulated two triple doubles. He was again named an All-American. He also was a finalist for the Naismith College Player of the Year and the John R. Wooden Award that are annually given the most outstanding player in college basketball.

Hardaway achieved a 3.4 cumulative GPA, but passed up his senior season to enter the 1993 NBA Draft. In 1994, Memphis State retired his jersey number, 25, Hardaway's number while playing for the Tigers. He returned to the University of Memphis in May 2003 and graduated with a bachelor's degree in professional studies, ten years after leaving school early to turn pro.

Hardaway was named #5 on the list of top 100 modern college point guards by collegehoopsnet.com. Additionally, he was a leading vote getter on ESPN Conference USA Silver Anniversary Team.

== Professional career ==
=== Orlando Magic (1993–1999) ===
==== 1993–94 season: All-Rookie honors ====
Hardaway was selected by the Golden State Warriors in the first round of the 1993 NBA draft (third pick overall), but was traded along with three future first-round picks to the Orlando Magic for the rights to first overall pick Chris Webber. The Magic's intent was to draft Webber and pair him with Shaquille O'Neal until Hardaway – whose desire was to play alongside O'Neal – requested a second workout to show why he should be their pick. Two days before the draft, Hardaway participated in a pick-up basketball game with several Magic players and local talent and impressed the organization enough to make the draft day trade. He would sign a 13-year, $65 million contract, which contained an escape clause after his rookie season which would allow him to go into restricted free agency.

Having played point guard in college while drawing comparisons to Magic Johnson, he started out the season at the shooting guard position as he learned how to run an NBA point from veteran Scott Skiles. By mid-season he took over point guard duties from Skiles. He immediately made an impact on the league, winning the Most Valuable Player (MVP) award at the inaugural Schick Rookie Game. Hardaway helped the Magic to their first playoff berth and first 50-win season. He averaged 16 points, 6.6 assists, 5.4 rebounds per game while his 190 steals ranked 6th in the league. He recorded his first career triple double on April 15 when he registered 14 points, 12 assists, and 11 rebounds against the Boston Celtics. For his efforts he was named to the NBA All-Rookie first team and was the runner-up for Rookie of the Year to Chris Webber.

==== 1994–95 season: First All-Star and NBA Finals appearance ====
Following the 1994 season, Hardaway would exercise his escape clause, and would not re-sign until mid-October, on a 9-year, $72 million contract, which again had an option, this time after the fifth year of the deal. During the 1994–95 NBA season, the Magic won a franchise record 57 games while Hardaway averaged 20.9 points, 7.2 assists, 4.4 rebounds, and 1.7 steals per game. He was named a starter in his first NBA All-Star Game and was named All-NBA First Team. The highlight of the playoff run was the second-round defeat of the Chicago Bulls. Along with Shaquille O'Neal, he led his team to the NBA Finals, where they were swept by the Houston Rockets. Despite the sweep Hardaway averaged 25.5 points, 4.8 rebounds and 8 assists in the series, while shooting 50% from the field.

==== 1995–96 season: 2nd All-NBA First Team selection and surgery ====
An injury to star teammate Shaquille O'Neal at the start of the 1995–96 NBA season forced Hardaway to take on more of the scoring load during the first few weeks of the season. He responded by leading the Magic to a 17–5 start. He was named NBA Player of the Month for November by averaging 27.0 points, 6.5 assists, 5.8 rebounds, 2.2 steals, and 1 block per game. He was named a starter in the NBA All-Star Game for the second consecutive season while leading the Magic to a franchise record 60 wins. For the season he was named to the All-NBA First Team for the second consecutive year while averaging 21.7 points, 7.1 assists and 4.3 rebounds and capturing 166 steals which was good for 5th in the league. He also finished third in MVP voting. Hardaway was again the only player in the NBA who averaged at least 20 points and five assists and shot 50 percent on field goals during the regular season. The Magic's playoff run ended in the Eastern Conference Finals to the eventual champion Chicago Bulls. In the 12-game playoff run Hardaway averaged 23.3 points, 6 assists, and 4.7 rebounds.

Hardaway later admitted his first serious knee injury was sustained in a 1996 playoff game against Detroit when Joe Dumars hit him in the back of his knee but he played through the pain. He then said he underwent surgery during the off-season and felt that the injury had robbed him of his explosiveness.

==== 1996–97 season: Olympic gold medal and franchise player ====
During the summer of 1996, Hardaway played on the 1996 US Olympic Games Basketball Team, which won a gold medal. Hardaway averaged 9 points, 4.4 assists, 2.8 rebounds, and 1.4 steals in the eight games. His two biggest contributions were in the quarterfinal game against Brazil where he chipped in 14 points and in the gold medal game against FR Yugoslavia where he scored 17 points.

The departure of O'Neal during the off-season to the Los Angeles Lakers left Hardaway as the lone star on the Magic heading into the 1996–97 NBA season. Hardaway struggled through an injury-filled season but still managed to be named a starter for the third consecutive time in the NBA All-Star game. During the season, Hardaway, being the team leader, led a coup to fire then coach Brian Hill with only 33 games left during the season. In 59 regular-season games he averaged 20.5 points, 5.6 assists, 4.5 rebounds, and 1.6 steals per game and was named to the All-NBA Third Team. The Magic managed to make the playoffs with a 45-win season. In the playoffs the Magic fell 0–2 to the Miami Heat in the first round. Hardaway then scored 42 points in game 3 and 41 in Game 4 to force a Game 5 in Miami (becoming the 1st player in NBA history to score 40 points in back to back playoff games when his team scores less than 100 while also being the first player to score 40 points back to back in the playoffs against a Pat Riley-coached team). Hardaway scored 33 points in Game 5 but the Magic fell short. Hardaway finished the playoffs with averages of 31 points, 6 rebounds, 3.4 assists, 2.4 steals, and 1.4 blocks per game. His playoff scoring average finished a close second to Michael Jordan (31.1).

==== 1997–98 season: Knee injury ====
A devastating left knee injury incurred early in the 1997–98 NBA season required surgery and forced Hardaway to miss the majority of the season. Despite injury, he was voted to start the NBA All-Star Game for the fourth straight year, and had six points and three assists in 12 minutes at New York. He played his last game a week after the All-Star game and missed the remainder of the season. In 19 games he averaged 16.4 points, 4 rebounds, 3.6 assists, and 1.5 steals.

==== 1998–99 season: Final season in Orlando ====
Hardaway returned during the lockout-shortened 1999 season and managed to play in all 50 regular-season games to lead the Magic to a share of the best regular-season record in the Eastern Conference. He averaged 15.8 points, 5.7 rebounds and 5.3 assists, and his 111 steals placed him 5th in the league. The Magic then lost a first-round series to the Philadelphia 76ers in which Hardaway averaged 19 points, 5.5 assists, 5 rebounds, and 2.3 steals. Following the season, Hardaway would use his opt-out clause to become an unrestricted free agent, giving up the remaining 4 years, and $40 million left remaining on the contract he signed in 1994.

In 369 regular season games with the Magic, Hardaway averaged 19 points, 6.3 assists, 4.7 rebounds, and 1.9 steals per game. In 45 playoff games he averaged 21.8 points, 6.5 assists, 4.9 rebounds, and 1.9 steals.

=== Phoenix Suns (1999–2004) ===
Hardaway landed in Phoenix on a 7-year, $86.6 million contract via a sign-and-trade with the Magic to team with fellow All-Star guard Jason Kidd, with Danny Manning, Pat Garrity and two future first round-draft picks going to Orlando. Injuries to Hardaway's foot and Kidd's ankle allowed them to play just 45 games together (33–12 with both in lineup). In 60 games Hardaway averaged 16.9 points, 5.8 rebounds, 5.3 assists, and 1.6 steals with a 42–18 record. The Suns finished with a 53–29 record and a 5th seed in the Western Conference Playoffs. The ankle injury to Kidd forced him to miss most of the first-round series against the defending champion San Antonio Spurs. Hardaway stepped up and recorded a 17-point, 13-assist, 12-rebound triple-double in a crucial Game 3 win. The Suns disposed of the Spurs in four games. The Conference Semi-Finals pitted Hardaway against his former teammate Shaquille O'Neal and the Los Angeles Lakers. The Suns fell short to the eventual champion Lakers in 5 games. Hardaway averaged 20.3 points, 5.7 assists, 4.9 rebounds, 1.6 steals, and 1 block per game during the nine playoff games.

The outlook was optimistic heading into the 2000–01 NBA season, but two microfracture surgeries on his left knee forced Hardaway to miss all but four games during the season. In those four games he averaged 9.8 points, 4.5 rebounds, 3.8 assists, and 1.5 steals.

Hardaway entered the 2001–02 NBA season healthy and managed to play in 80 regular-season games. Jason Kidd and Chris Dudley had been traded to the New Jersey Nets for new point guard Stephon Marbury, Johnny Newman, and Soumaila Samake. Kidd's pass-first style was switched with Marbury's shoot-first style which led to Hardaway and Marbury butting heads. Hardaway managed to average 19.9 points, 5.4 rebounds, 4.6 assists, and 1.7 steals during the month of November. The team traded for guard Joe Johnson during the season which relegated Hardaway to the bench for the first time in his career. Despite this he averaged 12 points, 4.4 rebounds, 4.1 assists, and 1.5 steals during the regular season.

Hardaway entered the 2002–03 NBA season coming off the bench. Inconsistent play by Joe Johnson allowed Hardaway to return to the starting lineup early in the season. His steady veteran play was a key component to a team that had young stars such as Marbury, Amar'e Stoudemire, and Shawn Marion. Hardaway did miss 24 games with a hand injury in which the team went 10–14 in his absence. He returned in time to record a 10-point, 10-assist, 10-rebound triple-double on April 9 against the Dallas Mavericks. Hardaway finished the regular season averaging 10.6 points, 4.4 rebounds, 4.1 assists, and 1.1 steals. The Suns gave the eventual champion San Antonio Spurs a scare in the first round before losing in six games. Hardaway averaged 12.7 points, 6 rebounds, 4.3 assists, and 2.2 steals in the series.

The 2003–04 NBA season saw Hardaway shuffle in and out of the Phoenix Suns starting lineup, and heading towards the halfway point of the season, the Suns who were 12–23 and sitting in last place in the Western Conference, decided to shed the salaries of their two stars, Hardaway (owed $30.4 million through 2005–06) and Marbury (owed $76 million through 2008–09), and instead bottom out and go into the 2004 offseason with a large amount of cap space. He averaged 8.7 points, 2.9 rebounds, and 2.9 assists in 34 games for the Suns. Phoenix used the cap room that was carved out via the trade to sign free-agent point guard Steve Nash to a huge deal starting in 2004–05.

In 236 regular season games with the Suns he averaged 12.4 points, 4.5 rebounds, 4.2 assists, and 1.3 steals. In 15 playoff games he averaged 17.3 points, 5.3 rebounds, 5.1 assists, and 1.8 steals.

=== New York Knicks (2004–2006) ===
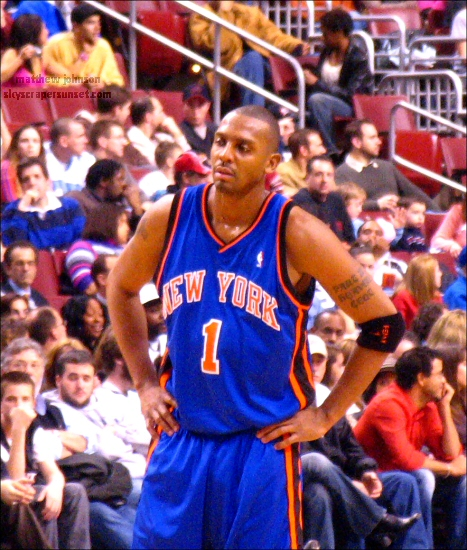
Hardaway with the Knicks in 2005

On January 6, 2004, Hardaway was traded to the New York Knicks along with Marbury and backup center Cezary Trybański in exchange for Howard Eisley, Maciej Lampe, Charlie Ward, and Antonio McDyess, as well as the draft rights of Miloš Vujanić and two future first-round draft picks.

Hardaway and Marbury helped lead the Knicks to the 2004 NBA Playoffs. In 42 regular-season games with the Knicks, Hardaway averaged 9.6 points, 4.5 rebounds, 1.9 assists, and 1 steal. In 76 total games during the season he averaged 9.2 points, 3.8 rebounds, and 2.3 assists. In the playoffs the Knicks lost in the first round to the New Jersey Nets. Hardaway led the Knicks in scoring in two playoff games while averaging 16.5 points, 5.8 assists, 4.5 rebounds, and 1.5 steals in the series.

Hardaway spent most of 2004–05 NBA season fighting various injuries. He averaged 11.9 points, 2.6 assists, and 2.5 rebounds in an 11-game span during the middle part of the season. He finished the season averaging 7.3 points, 2.4 rebounds, and 2 assists in 37 games.

Hardaway played just four games for the Knicks in the 2005–06 NBA season while trying to rehabilitate arthritic knees. He averaged 2.5 points, 2.5 rebounds, and 2 assists in those games.

In 83 games for the Knicks he averaged 8.2 points, 3.5 rebounds, and 1.9 assists.

On February 22, 2006, Hardaway was traded back to Orlando, along with Trevor Ariza, for Steve Francis. Five days later, the Magic waived Hardaway.

=== Miami Heat (2007) ===
On August 9, 2007, Hardaway, who hadn't played in an NBA game in almost two years, was signed by the Miami Heat on a league minimum deal, reuniting him with former teammate Shaquille O'Neal. With Dorell Wright already wearing number 1, Hardaway wore jersey number 7, marking the first time in his pro career that he didn't wear number 1. On December 12, 2007, he was waived by the Miami Heat in order to free up a team spot for free agent Luke Jackson. In 16 regular season games, he averaged 3.8 points, 2.2 rebounds, 2.2 assists & 1.19 steals. His best game of the season was on November 17, with 6–6 shooting for 16 points in a win on the road over New Jersey Nets, 91–87.

== Coaching career ==
In 2011, Hardaway took over for his friend Desmond Merriweather as a coach for his middle school alma mater, Lester Middle School, while Merriweather was undergoing treatment for colon cancer. With a goal to have each of his players graduate from college, Hardaway instituted a mandatory tutoring program. He coached the Lester Lions to the West Tennessee State title 58–57, finishing 28–3 for the season.

=== Memphis (2018–present) ===
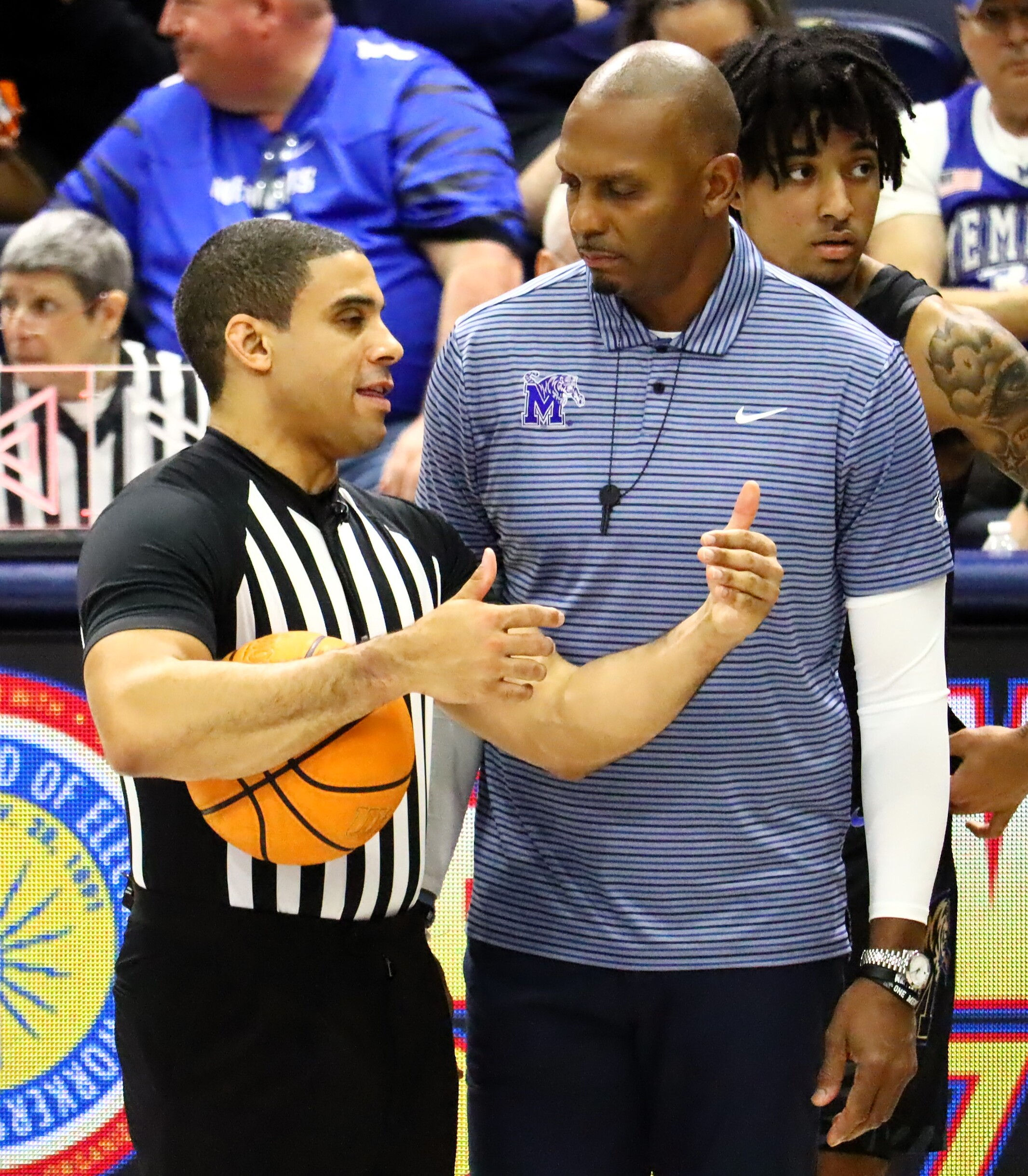
Hardaway (right) with Memphis during a game in 2025

Hardaway was hired as head coach by his alma mater, the Memphis Tigers, on March 19, 2018, replacing Tubby Smith. In his first year as head coach, Hardaway led the Tigers to the National Invitation Tournament (NIT). He also secured the number one recruiting class in the country with the commitments of number one rated high school player James Wiseman, D. J. Jeffries, who decommitted from Kentucky; Boogie Ellis, who decommitted from Duke; and others. On May 17, 2019, Precious Achiuwa, a top-20 five-star recruit, signed with Memphis. In 2023, Hardaway led Memphis to an American Athletic Conference championship and a berth in the 2023 NCAA Tournament, getting eliminated in controversial fashion to FAU. In the 2024-2025 season, Hardaway led Memphis to an outright American Athletic Conference regular season championship with a conference record of 16-2.

== Television and film ==
Before Hardaway was drafted, he and future Orlando Magic teammate Shaquille O'Neal acted in prominent roles in the college basketball feature film Blue Chips (1994); Both players portrayed college freshman on the varsity basketball team of a fictional university.

In the mid to late 1990s, Hardaway starred in the Nike advertising campaign "Lil Penny", featuring an alter ego puppet version of Hardaway which was voiced by comedian Chris Rock.

Hardaway was featured in the ESPN 30 for 30 documentary series film This Magic Moment (2016) which focuses on the Orlando Magic teams led by him and Shaquille O'Neal in the mid-1990s.

He was also interviewed in the 2025 HBO MAX documentary We Beat The Dream Team.

== Other pursuits ==
Hardaway made more than $120 million in his 16-season career. He owns a barbershop and beauty salon in downtown Memphis and a turf business based in Miami.

Hardaway is also known for his efforts to promote sports in Memphis. In 2010, he helped revitalize the Bluff City Classic, a summer basketball league that provides a high level of competition for men and women players from the college, professional, and elite high school ranks. Hardaway also provided funding to build the University of Memphis Sports Hall of Fame. In 2011, Hardaway announced plans for a permanent $20 million multi-sports facility named FastBreak Courts Sportsplex in Cordova. The sporting complex would support volleyball, cheerleading and wrestling, with seven basketball courts, a 2,000-seat arena, rehabilitation clinic and classrooms. It was expected to boost the Memphis-area economy by generating over $14.5 million in annual visitor spending and directly supporting 236 local jobs.

In 2012, Hardaway was announced to be part of an ownership group including Peyton Manning and Justin Timberlake that was to purchase a minority stake in the Memphis Grizzlies.

== Personal life ==
Penny has two sons, Jayden and Ashton, who both play for their father at Memphis. Penny also has two daughters born in 1992 and 1995, both with his former girlfriend from high school.

Hardaway is a member of Kappa Alpha Psi fraternity.

On December 29, 2023, Hardaway received his first ever nomination to be inducted into the Naismith Basketball Hall of Fame.

== NBA career statistics ==
Legend
GP	Games played	GS	Games started	MPG	Minutes per game
FG%	Field goal percentage	3P%	3-point field goal percentage	FT%	Free throw percentage
RPG	Rebounds per game	APG	Assists per game	SPG	Steals per game
BPG	Blocks per game	PPG	Points per game	**Bold**	Career high
*	Led the league

=== Regular season ===
Year	Team	GP	GS	MPG	FG%	3P%	FT%	RPG	APG	SPG	BPG	PPG
1993–94	Orlando	**82**	**82**	36.8	.466	.267	.742	5.4	6.6	**2.3**	0.6	16.0
1994–95	Orlando	77	77	37.7	.512	.349	.769	4.4	**7.2**	1.7	0.3	20.9
1995–96	Orlando	**82**	**82***	36.8	**.513**	.314	.767	4.3	7.1	2.0	0.5	**21.7**
1996–97	Orlando	59	59	37.6	.447	.318	.820	4.5	5.6	1.6	0.6	20.5
1997–98	Orlando	19	15	32.9	.377	.300	.763	4.0	3.6	1.5	**0.8**	16.4
1998–99	Orlando	50*	50*	**38.9**	.420	.286	.706	5.7	5.3	2.2	0.5	15.8
1999–00	Phoenix	60	60	37.6	.474	.324	.790	**5.8**	6.3	1.6	0.6	16.9
2000–01	Phoenix	4	4	28.0	.416	.250	.636	4.5	3.8	1.5	0.3	9.8
2001–02	Phoenix	80	56	30.8	.418	.277	.810	4.4	4.1	1.5	0.4	12.0
2002–03	Phoenix	58	51	30.6	.447	.356	.794	4.4	4.1	1.1	0.4	10.6
2003–04	Phoenix	34	10	25.8	.443	.400	.857	2.9	2.9	0.8	0.2	8.7
2003–04	New York	42	4	29.0	.390	.364	.775	4.5	1.9	1.0	0.3	9.6
2004–05	New York	37	0	24.2	.423	.300	.739	2.4	2.0	0.8	0.1	7.3
2005–06	New York	4	0	18.0	.286	.000	**1.000**	2.5	2.0	0.5	0.0	2.5
2007–08	Miami	16	8	20.3	.367	**.421**	.889	2.2	2.2	1.2	0.1	3.8
Career		704	558	33.7	.458	.316	.774	4.5	5.0	1.6	0.4	15.2
All-Star		4	4	24.5	.625	.417	.833	3.7	6.0	1.0	0.0	13.7

=== Playoffs ===
Year	Team	GP	GS	MPG	FG%	3P%	FT%	RPG	APG	SPG	BPG	PPG
1994	Orlando	3	3	**44.3**	.440	.455	.700	**6.7**	7.0	1.7	**2.0**	18.7
1995	Orlando	**21**	**21**	40.4	**.472**	.404	.757	3.8	**7.7**	1.9	0.7	19.6
1996	Orlando	12	12	39.4	.465	.364	.744	4.7	6.0	1.7	0.3	23.3
1997	Orlando	5	5	44.0	.468	.367	.741	6.0	3.4	**2.4**	1.4	**31.0**
1999	Orlando	4	4	41.8	.351	**.462**	.769	5.0	5.5	2.3	0.3	19.0
2000	Phoenix	9	9	42.9	.462	.263	.710	4.9	5.7	1.6	1.2	20.3
2003	Phoenix	6	6	40.7	.386	.360	.722	6.0	4.3	2.2	0.8	12.7
2004	New York	4	3	42.0	.365	.357	**.833**	4.5	5.8	1.5	0.3	16.5
Career		64	63	41.3	.448	.380	.746	4.7	6.2	1.9	0.8	20.4

== Head coaching record ==
=== College ===
Record table
Season	Team	Overall	Conference	Standing	Postseason
Memphis Tigers (American Athletic/American Conference) (2018–present)
2018–19	Memphis	22–14	11–7	5th	NIT second round
2019–20	Memphis	21–10	10–8	T–5th	
2020–21	Memphis	20–8	11–4	3rd	NIT Champion
2021–22	Memphis	22–11	13–5	3rd	NCAA Division I Round of 32
2022–23	Memphis	26–9	13–5	2nd	NCAA Division I Round of 64
2023–24	Memphis	22–10	11–7	T–5th	
2024–25	Memphis	29–6	16–2	1st	NCAA Division I Round of 64
2025–26	Memphis	13–19	8–10	T–8th	
2026–27	Memphis	3–1	0–0		
Memphis:		178–88 (.669)	93–48 (.660)		
Total:		178–88 (.669)			
National champion Postseason invitational champion Conference regular season champion Conference regular season and conference tournament champion Division regular season champion Division regular season and conference tournament champion Conference tournament champion
