= CBS/Chevrolet Men's College Basketball Coach of the Year Award =

College basketball coach award

CBS/Chevrolet College Basketball National Coach of the Year
- Awarded for: the best men's college basketball head coach in NCAA Division I competition
- Country: United States
- Presented by: CBS Sports/Chevrolet

History
- First award: 1981
- Final award: 2009

The CBS/Chevrolet Men's College Basketball National Coach of the Year Award was an honor given annually from 1981 through 2009 to recognize the top head coach in NCAA Division I men's college basketball. Sponsored by Chevrolet and broadcast or heavily associated with CBS Sports during an era of massive college basketball growth, it served as one of the prominent national coaching accolades, and the winners are still published in the annually updated NCAA Division I men's basketball media guides.

The late 1970s and 1980s saw a boom in corporate sponsorships tied directly to network television broadcasts of college athletics. Chevrolet's multi-year backing of this award was a staple of CBS's college basketball broadcasts, often accompanied by vignettes or special broadcast segments honoring the winning coach. When CBS's broadcast priorities and college basketball marketing shifted in the late 2000s, the partnership dissolved and the final CBS/Chevrolet National Coach of the Year Award was presented in 2009.

Three coaches won the award multiple times: Gene Keady (1982, 1984, 1995, 1996), Dale Brown (1981, 1985), and Mike Krzyzewski (1986, 2000). The only coach to have won a national championship in the same season he was named the CBS/Chevrolet National Coach of the Year was Nolan Richardson of Arkansas (1994).

== Key ==
Coach (X)	Denotes the number of times the coach has been awarded the CBS/Chevrolet Coach of the Year Award at that point
W, L, W %	Total wins, total losses, win percentage
Finish	National postseason tournament result
C	Denotes national championship season

== Winners ==
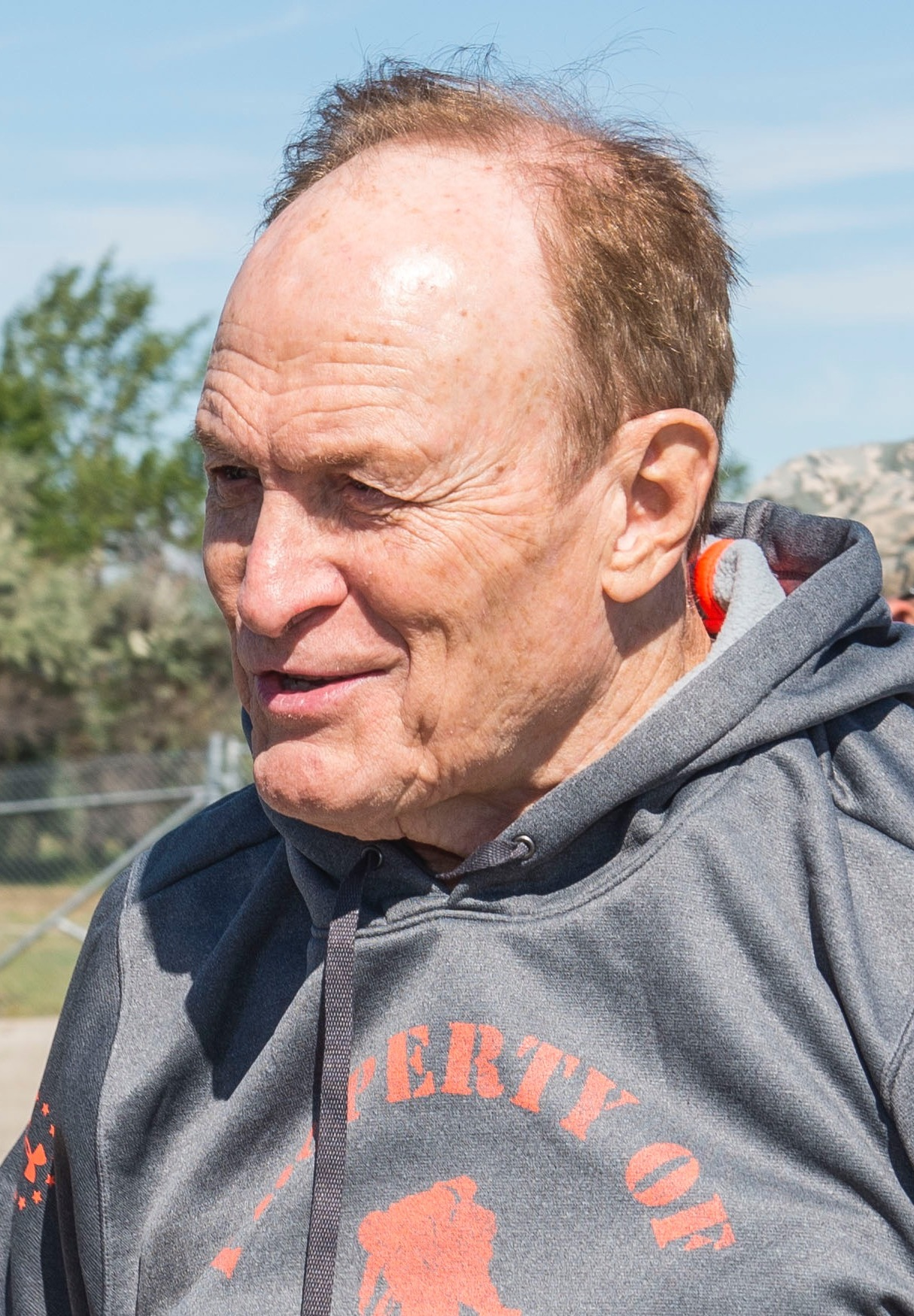
Dale Brown, LSU, 1981 and 1985

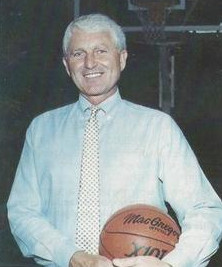
Lute Olson, Arizona, 1989

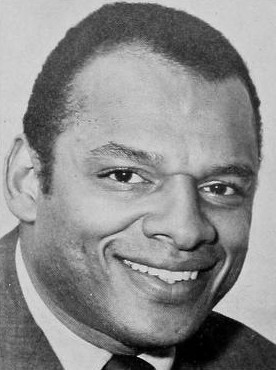
George Raveling, USC, 1992

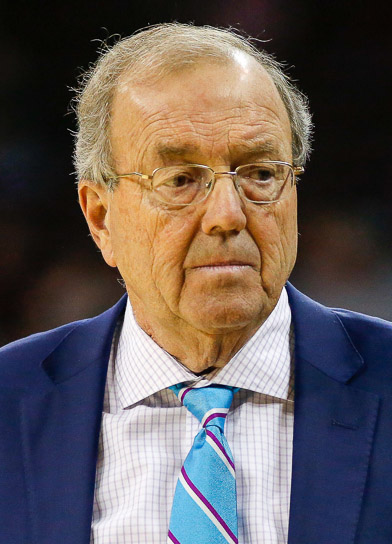
Cliff Ellis, Auburn, 1999

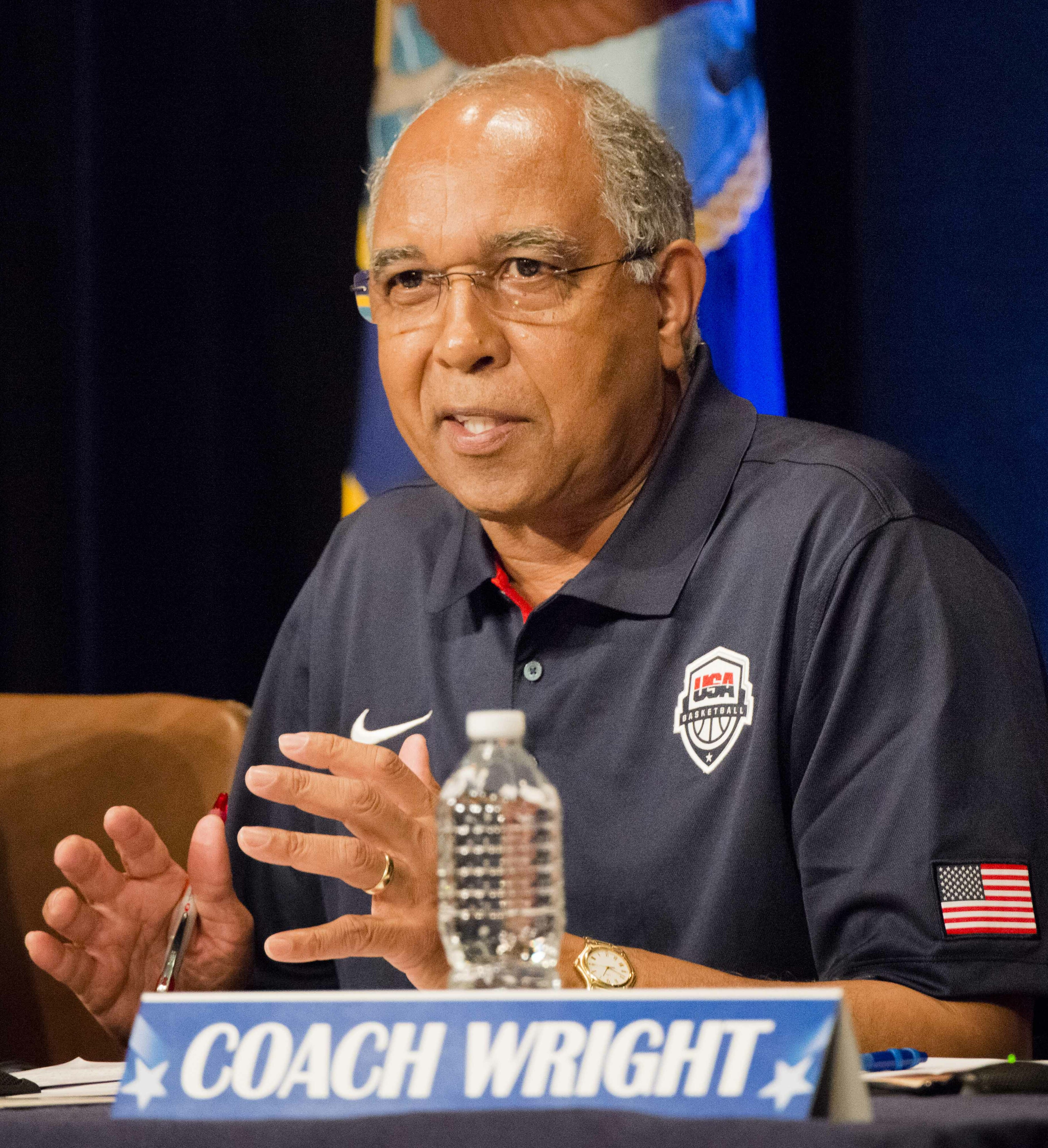
Tubby Smith, Kentucky, 2003

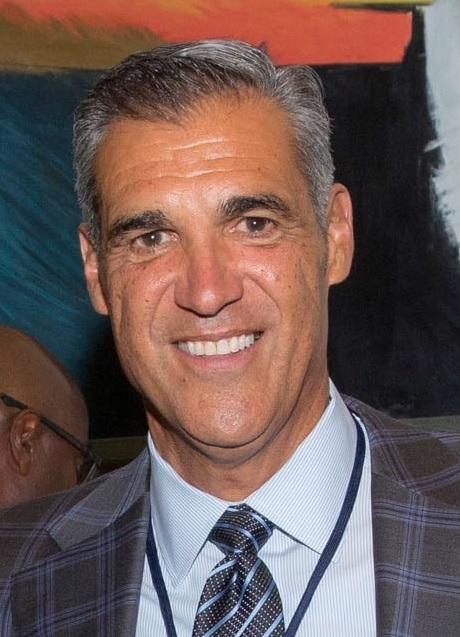
Jay Wright, Villanova, 2006

Season	Coach	School	W	L	W %	Finish	Reference
1980–81	Dale Brown	LSU	31	5	.861	NCAA Final Four	
1981–82	Gene Keady	Purdue	18	14	.563	NIT runners-up	
1982–83	Lou Carnesecca	St. John's	28	5	.848	NCAA Sweet Sixteen	
1983–84	Gene Keady (2)	Purdue	22	7	.759	NCAA second round	
1984–85	Dale Brown (2)	LSU	19	10	.655	NCAA first round	
1985–86	Mike Krzyzewski	Duke	37	3	.925	NCAA runners-up	
1986–87	Joey Meyer	DePaul	28	3	.903	NCAA Sweet Sixteen	
1987–88	John Chaney	Temple	32	2	.941	NCAA Elite Eight	
1988–89	Lute Olson	Arizona	29	4	.879	NCAA Sweet Sixteen	
1989–90	Jim Calhoun	UConn	31	6	.838	NCAA Elite Eight	
1990–91	Randy Ayers	Ohio State	27	4	.871	NCAA Sweet Sixteen	
1991–92	George Raveling	USC	24	6	.800	NCAA second round	
1992–93	Eddie Fogler	Vanderbilt	28	6	.824	NCAA Sweet Sixteen	
1993–94	Nolan Richardson	Arkansas	31	3	.912	NCAA champion^{C}	
1994–95	Gene Keady (3)	Purdue	25	7	.781	NCAA second round	
1995–96	Gene Keady (4)	Purdue	26^{[a]}	6^{[a]}	.813^{[a]}	NCAA second round	
1996–97	Clem Haskins^{[b]}	Minnesota^{[b]}	31^{[b]}	4^{[b]}	.886^{[b]}	NCAA Final Four^{[b]}	
1997–98	Bill Guthridge	North Carolina	34	4	.895	NCAA Final Four	
1998–99	Cliff Ellis	Auburn	29	4	.879	NCAA Sweet Sixteen	
1999–00	Mike Krzyzewski (2)	Duke	29	5	.853	NCAA Sweet Sixteen	
2000–01	Al Skinner	Boston College	27	5	.844	NCAA second round	
2001–02	Kelvin Sampson	Oklahoma	31	5	.861	NCAA Final Four	
2002–03	Tubby Smith	Kentucky	32	4	.889	NCAA Elite Eight	
2003–04	Phil Martelli	Saint Joseph's	30	2	.938	NCAA Elite Eight	
2004–05	Bruce Weber	Illinois	37	2	.949	NCAA runners-up	
2005–06	Jay Wright	Villanova	28	5	.848	NCAA Elite Eight	
2006–07	Tony Bennett	Washington State	26	8	.765	NCAA second round	
2007–08	Keno Davis	Drake	28	5	.848	NCAA first round	
2008–09	Bill Self	Kansas	27	8	.771	NCAA Sweet Sixteen	

- ^{a} In 1999, the NCAA Division I Committee on Infractions ruled that Purdue had violated laws involving recruiting, extra benefits, and ethical conduct, as well as several secondary violations in the women's basketball program. Their 26–6 overall record (15–3 conference) retroactively forfeited 18 wins and vacated 2 games for using an ineligible player.
- ^{b} Due to the numbers and severity of NCAA violations that had surfaced, Clem Haskins and the Minnesota men's basketball season records and awards were nullified, giving them a 0–0 record and no official recognition for having gotten to the 1997 Final Four.
